= Presidency of Joe Biden =

2021–2025 U.S. presidential administration

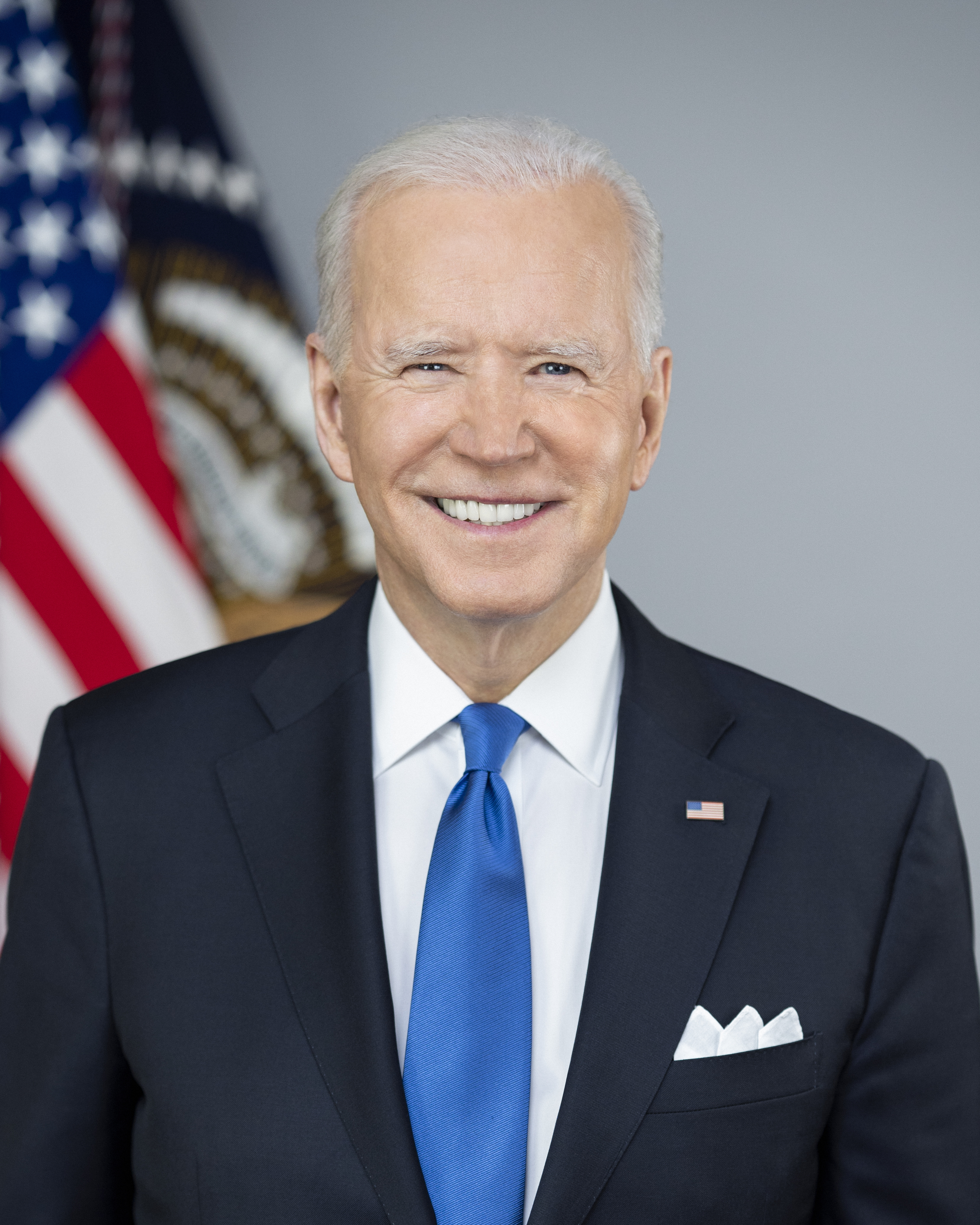
- Official portrait, 2021
- Presidency of Joe Biden; January 20, 2021 – January 20, 2025
- Vice President: Kamala Harris
- Cabinet: Full list
- Party: Democratic
- Election: 2020
- Seat: White House
- Seal of the President

Joe Biden's tenure as the 46th president of the United States began with his inauguration on January 20, 2021, and ended on January 20, 2025. Biden, a member of the Democratic Party, had previously served as the 47th vice president from 2009 to 2017 under President Barack Obama, took office after defeating the Republican incumbent president Donald Trump in the 2020 presidential election. Upon his inauguration, he became the oldest president in American history, breaking the record set by Ronald Reagan. Alongside Biden's presidency, the Democratic Party also held their slim majorities in the House of Representatives and the Senate during the 117th U.S. Congress following the 2020 elections, thereby attained an overall federal government trifecta. Biden entered office amid the COVID-19 pandemic, an economic crisis, and increased political polarization.

Day one actions of his presidency included restoring U.S. participation in the Paris Agreement, revoking the permit for the Keystone XL pipeline and halting funding for the Mexico–United States border wall. On his second day, he issued a series of executive orders to reduce the impact of COVID-19, including invoking the Defense Production Act of 1950, and set an early goal of achieving one hundred million COVID-19 vaccinations in the United States in his first 100 days. The first major legislation signed into law by Biden was the American Rescue Plan Act of 2021, a $1.9 trillion stimulus bill that temporarily established expanded unemployment insurance and sent $1,400 stimulus checks to most Americans in response to continued economic pressure from COVID-19. He signed the bipartisan Infrastructure Investment and Jobs Act, a ten-year plan brokered by Biden alongside Democrats and Republicans in Congress to invest in American roads, bridges, public transit, ports and broadband access.

Biden proposed a significant expansion of the U.S. social safety net through the Build Back Better Act, but those efforts, along with voting rights legislation, failed in Congress. In August 2022, Biden signed the Inflation Reduction Act of 2022, a domestic appropriations bill that included some of the provisions of the Build Back Better Act after the entire bill failed to pass. It included significant federal investment in climate and domestic clean energy production, tax credits for solar panels, electric cars and other home energy programs as well as a three-year extension of Affordable Care Act subsidies, an insulin price cap, and a provision allowing Medicare to negotiate drug prices. In late 2022, Biden signed the Respect for Marriage Act, which repealed the Defense of Marriage Act and codified same-sex and interracial marriage in the United States. Other domestic legislation signed during his term included the Bipartisan Safer Communities Act, the first major federal gun control law in nearly three decades; the CHIPS and Science Act, bolstering the semiconductor and manufacturing industry; the Honoring our PACT Act, expanding health care for US veterans; the Electoral Count Reform and Presidential Transition Improvement Act; and the Juneteenth National Independence Day Act, making Juneteenth a federal holiday in the United States. Biden also unsuccessfully pushed for legislation protecting the right to abortion in response to the U.S. Supreme Court's decision in Dobbs v. Jackson Women's Health Organization overturning Roe v. Wade.

Biden appointed Ketanji Brown Jackson to the U.S. Supreme Court—the first Black woman to serve on the court. In response to the debt-ceiling crisis of 2023, he negotiated and signed the Fiscal Responsibility Act of 2023, which restrains federal spending for fiscal years 2024 and 2025, implements minor changes to SNAP and TANF, includes energy permitting reform, claws back some IRS funding and unspent money for COVID-19, and suspended the debt ceiling to January 1, 2025. He established the American Climate Corps and created the first ever White House Office of Gun Violence Prevention. On September 26, 2023, Biden visited a United Auto Workers picket line during the 2023 United Auto Workers strike, making him the first US president to visit one. Biden also rigorously enforced antitrust laws by appointing Lina Khan to head the FTC. Biden issued more individual pardons and commutations than any other president, including controversial sweeping pardons of members of his family and high-profile political figures that he claimed were either presently or expected to be the subject of "baseless and politically motivated investigations." The first sitting U.S. president to oppose the death penalty, Biden commuted the sentences of nearly all inmates on federal death row to life imprisonment weeks before leaving office.

The foreign policy goal of the Biden administration was to restore the U.S. to a "position of trusted leadership" among global democracies in order to address the challenges posed by Russia and China. Biden signed AUKUS, an international security alliance together with Australia and the United Kingdom. He supported the expansion of NATO with the additions of Finland and Sweden. Biden approved a raid which led to the death of Abu Ibrahim al-Hashimi al-Qurashi, the leader of the Islamic State, and approved a drone strike which killed Ayman Al Zawahiri, leader of Al-Qaeda. He completed the withdrawal of U.S. military forces from Afghanistan, declaring an end to nation-building efforts and shifting U.S. foreign policy toward strategic competition with China and, to a lesser extent, Russia. During the withdrawal, the Afghan government collapsed and the Taliban seized control, leading to Biden receiving bipartisan criticism. He responded to the Russian invasion of Ukraine by imposing sanctions on Russia and providing Ukraine with over $100 billion in combined military, economic, and humanitarian aid. During the Gaza war, Biden condemned the actions of Hamas and other Palestinian militants as terrorism, and announced American military support for Israel; he also sent humanitarian aid to the Gaza Strip and brokered a four-day temporary pause and hostage exchange in 2023 followed by a three-phase ceasefire in January 2025. In 2023, Biden negotiated the Camp David Principles, a security pact between Japan, South Korea, and the United States. He also oversaw the 2024 Ankara prisoner exchange, the largest prisoner exchange since the end of the Cold War, involving the release of 26 individuals, including American journalist Evan Gershkovich and former U.S. Marine Paul Whelan.

Biden began his term with over 50% approval ratings; these fell significantly after the withdrawal from Afghanistan, and remained low as the country experienced high inflation and rising gas prices, even as they later decreased during his presidency. His age and mental fitness were a frequent subject of discussion throughout his presidency, ultimately culminating in his decision to withdraw his bid for re-election in the 2024 presidential election. Trump won the election against Biden's preferred successor, Kamala Harris, making him the second U.S. president to be succeeded in office by his predecessor. (Note: The first person was Benjamin Harrison as he was succeeded in office by his predecessor Grover Cleveland in 1893.) Biden oversaw the strongest economic recovery of any G7 nation post COVID-19 and one of the strongest economic recoveries in United States history, breaking a 70-year record for low unemployment, and the creation of over 16 million new jobs, the most of any single term president. During Biden's time in office, median wages stagnated, and the share of wealth of the wealthiest 0.1% of Americans continued to increase.

Although some political scientists and historians have rated Biden's presidency favorably, his political legacy is interwoven with the re-election of Trump in 2024.

== Milestones ==
=== 2020 election ===
2020 Electoral College vote results

Biden, who unsuccessfully sought the Democratic nomination in 1988 and 2008, and later served as the 47th vice president of the United States under President Barack Obama from 2009 to 2017, announced his candidacy for the nomination of the Democratic Party in the 2020 presidential election on April 25, 2019. In June 2020, Biden secured the Democratic nomination. Biden selected Senator Kamala Harris of California as his running mate, and the two were officially nominated at the 2020 Democratic National Convention.

On November 7, four days after the election, Biden was projected to have secured the presidency. Biden won the presidential election with 306 electoral votes and 51.3% of the popular vote, while Donald Trump received 232 electoral votes and 46.8% of the popular vote. The Trump campaign launched at least 63 lawsuits against the results, especially in the battleground states of Arizona, Georgia, Michigan, Nevada, Pennsylvania, and Wisconsin, raising unsubstantiated claims of widespread voter fraud that were subsequently dismissed by courts. The electoral votes were certified on January 6–7, 2021. In the concurrent congressional elections, Democrats secured a government trifecta after retaining their majority in the House of Representatives and winning back control of the Senate, leaving the partisan balance in the Senate at 50 Democrats and 50 Republicans, with vice president Kamala Harris' tie-breaking vote giving Democrats control of the chamber.

=== Transition period and inauguration ===
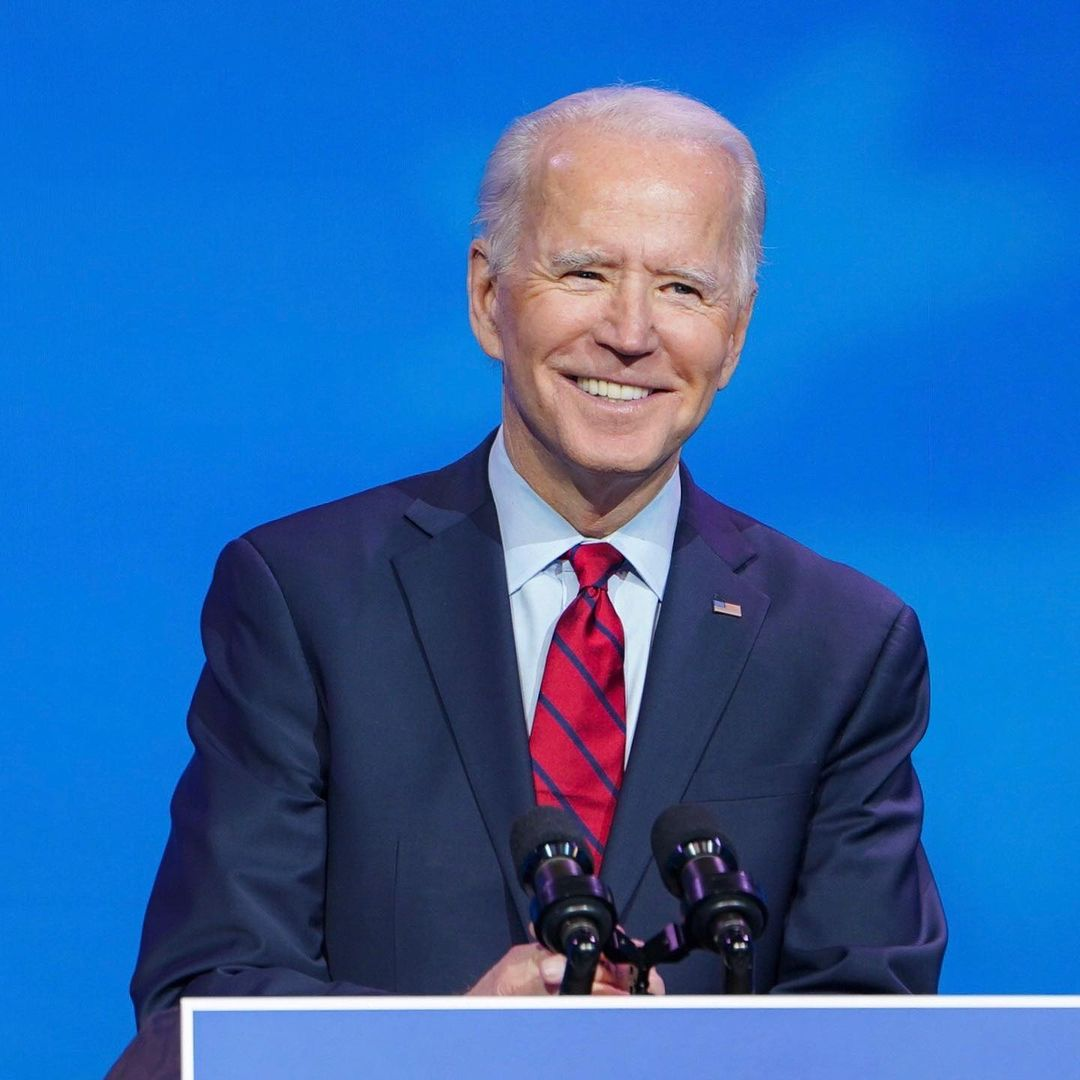
Biden as President-elect

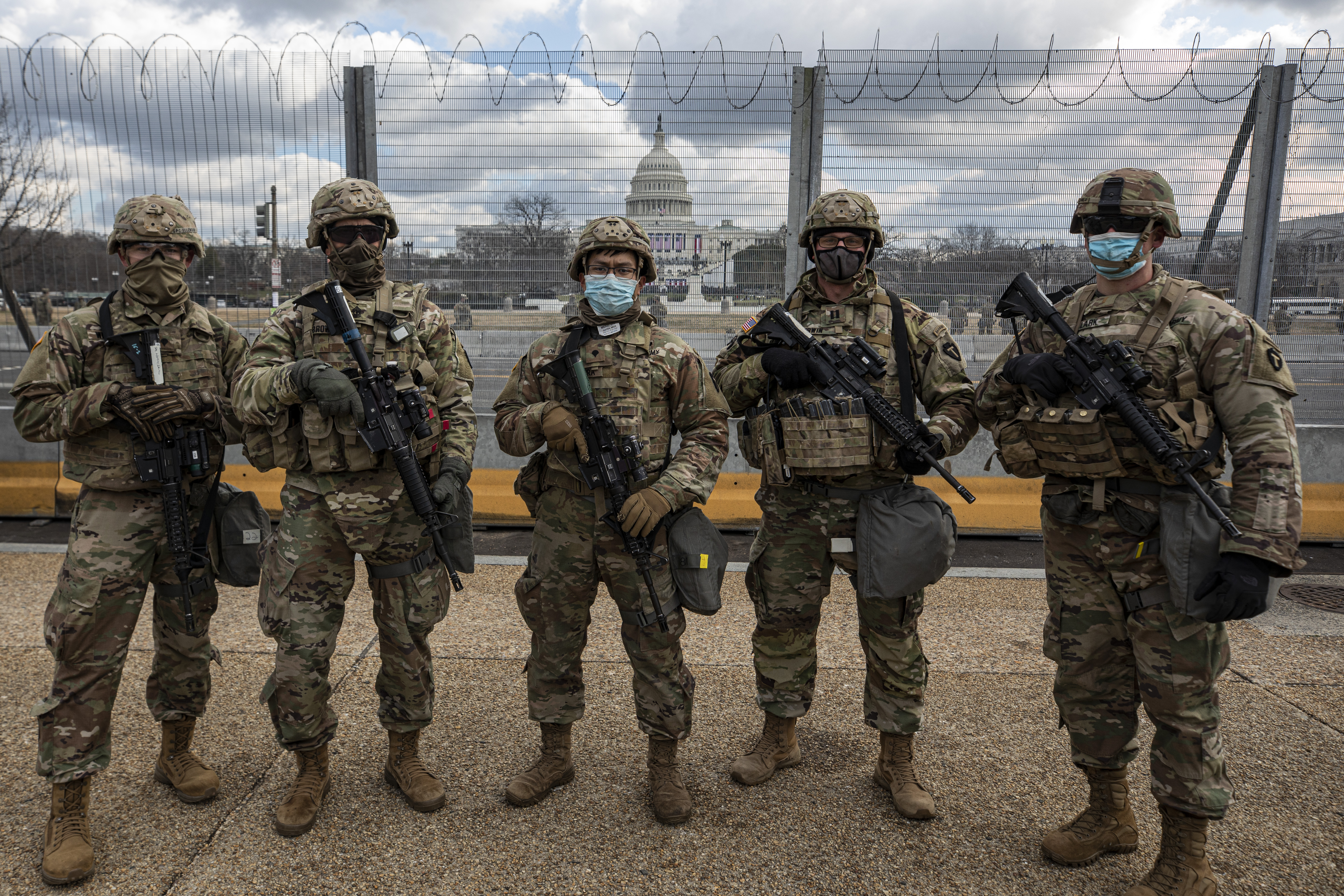
U.S. National Guard soldiers at the Capitol, January 20, 2021

Though Biden was generally acknowledged as the winner, General Services Administration head Emily W. Murphy initially refused to begin the transition to the president-elect, thereby denying funds and office space to his team. On November 23, after Michigan certified its results, Murphy issued the letter of ascertainment, granting the Biden transition team access to federal funds and resources for an orderly transition.

Two days after becoming the projected winner of the 2020 election, Biden announced the formation of a task force to advise him on the COVID-19 pandemic during the transition, co-chaired by former Surgeon General Vivek Murthy, former FDA commissioner David A. Kessler, and Yale University's Marcella Nunez-Smith.

On January 5, 2021, the Democratic Party won control of the United States Senate, effective January 20, as a result of electoral victories in Georgia by Jon Ossoff in a runoff election for a six-year term and Raphael Warnock in a special runoff election for a two-year term. President-elect Biden had supported and campaigned for both candidates prior to the runoff elections on January 5.

On January 6, a mob of thousands of Trump supporters violently stormed the Capitol in the hope of overturning Biden's election, forcing Congress to evacuate during the counting of the Electoral College votes. More than 26,000 National Guard members were deployed to the capital for the inauguration, with thousands remaining into the spring.

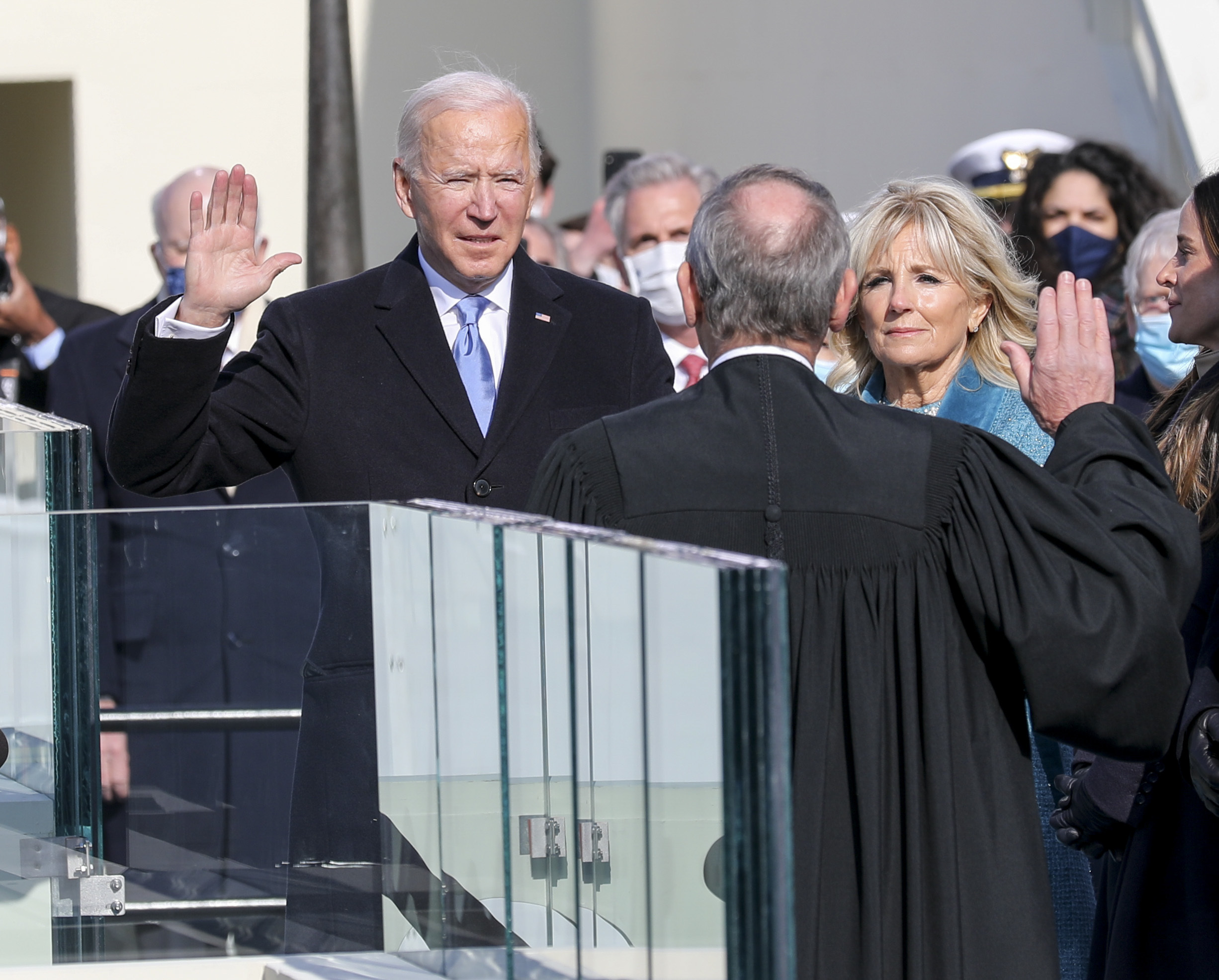
Chief Justice John Roberts administers the presidential oath of office to Biden at the Capitol, January 20, 2021.

On January 20, 2021, Biden was sworn in by U.S. Chief Justice John Roberts as the 46th president of the United States, completing the oath of office at 11:49 am EST, 11 minutes before the legal start of his term at 12:00 pm, EST.

==== Inaugural address ====
Biden's inaugural speech laid out his vision to unite the nation, prefaced by the various impacts of the COVID-19 pandemic, economic strife, climate change, political polarization, and racial injustice. Biden called for an end to the "uncivil war" of political, demographic, and ideological American cultures through a greater embrace of diversity. He cited the American Civil War, Great Depression, world wars, and September 11 attacks as moments in American history where citizens' "better angels" prevailed, saying that the unity, the solution, must again be invoked to rise from the "cascading" crises of the present; this unity, he proclaimed, exists in the "common objects" that define America: "opportunity, liberty, dignity, respect, honor, and ... truth." He explicitly decried white supremacy and nativism, calling them an "ugly reality" of American life he vows to defeat that clouds the "American ideal" set out in the U.S. Declaration of Independence — that all Americans are equal. Biden pledged that the U.S. would "engage with the world once again", "repair our alliances", and act as a "trusted partner for peace and security". Near the conclusion of his speech, Biden held a moment of silence for those who died in the COVID-19 pandemic. Quoting the Gene Scheer composition "American Anthem", he implored Americans to consider their legacy in answering the "call of history" to protect "democracy, hope, truth, and justice", "secure liberty", and make America a "beacon to the world", insisting that generations of their descendants would judge them on their actions.

=== First 100 days ===
The first hundred days of a President's term have been historically significant since the first term of Franklin D. Roosevelt who, in his first 100 days, worked on both legislative and executive actions to combat the great depression. In Biden's first hundred days, he signed 42 executive orders, more than any of his predecessors since Harry S. Truman. Many of these executive orders were reversals to Donald Trump's policies and to resume where Barack Obama—under whom Biden served as vice president—left off after his two terms in office. On March 11, he signed the American Rescue Plan, a $1.9 trillion bill to help relieve economic strain due to the COVID-19 pandemic.

== Administration ==
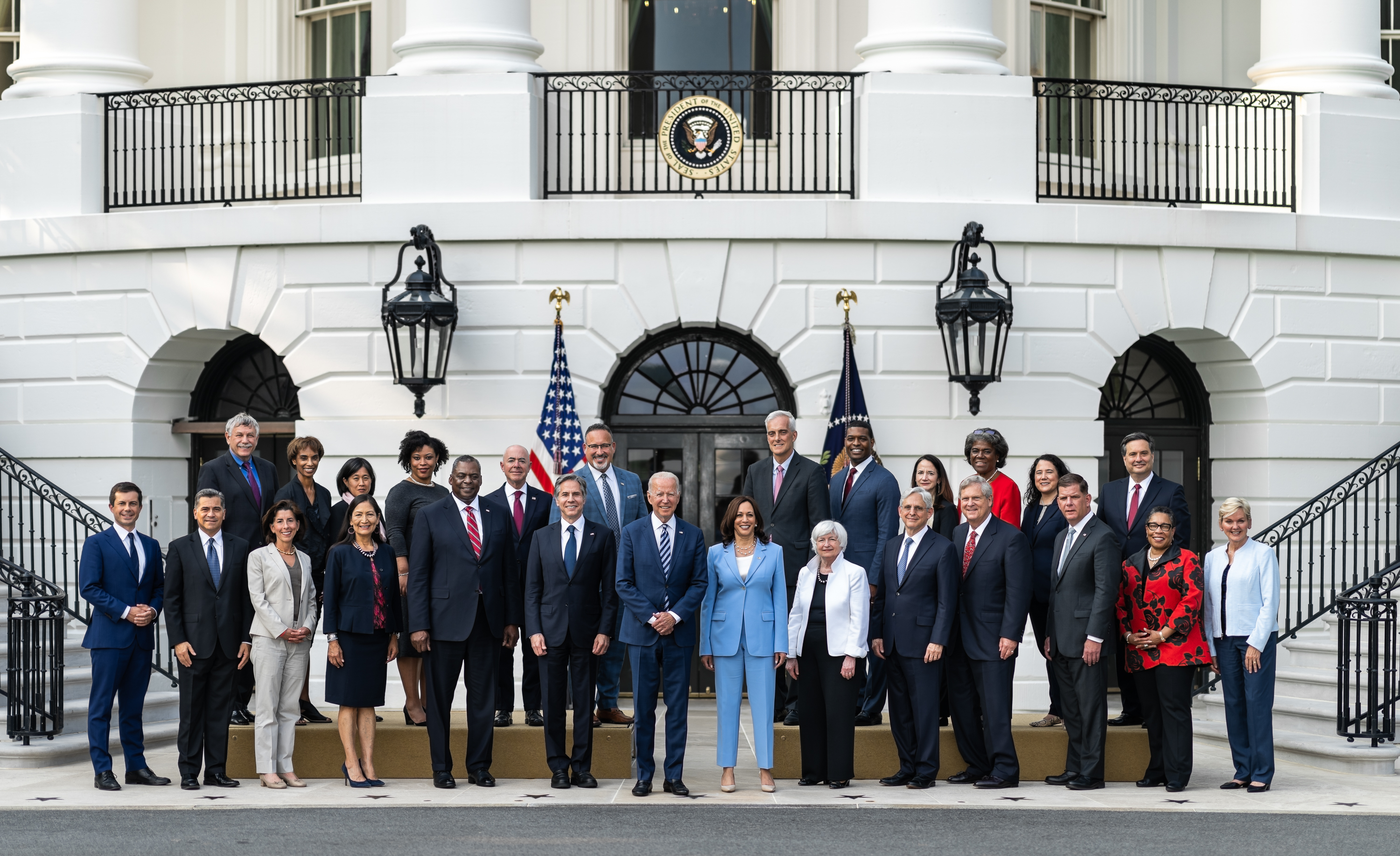

Biden cabinet
Office	Name	Term
President	Joe Biden	2021–2025
Vice President	Kamala Harris	2021–2025
Secretary of State	Antony Blinken	2021–2025
Secretary of the Treasury	Janet Yellen	2021–2025
Secretary of Defense	Lloyd Austin	2021–2025
Attorney General	Merrick Garland	2021–2025
Secretary of the Interior	Deb Haaland	2021–2025
Secretary of Agriculture	Tom Vilsack	2021–2025
Secretary of Commerce	Gina Raimondo	2021–2025
Secretary of Labor	Marty Walsh	2021–2023
Julie Su (acting)	2023–2025
Secretary of Health and Human Services	Xavier Becerra	2021–2025
Secretary of Housing and Urban Development	Marcia Fudge	2021–2024
Adrianne Todman (acting)	2024–2025
Secretary of Transportation	Pete Buttigieg	2021–2025
Secretary of Energy	Jennifer Granholm	2021–2025
Secretary of Education	Miguel Cardona	2021–2025
Secretary of Veterans Affairs	Denis McDonough	2021–2025
Secretary of Homeland Security	Alejandro Mayorkas	2021–2025
Administrator of the Environmental Protection Agency	Michael S. Regan	2021–2024
Jane Nishida (acting)	2025–2025
Director of the Office of Management and Budget	Shalanda Young	2021–2025
Director of National Intelligence	Avril Haines	2021–2025
Director of the Central Intelligence Agency	William J. Burns*	2021–2025
United States Trade Representative	Katherine Tai	2021–2025
Ambassador to the United Nations	Linda Thomas-Greenfield	2021–2025
Chair of the Council of Economic Advisers	Cecilia Rouse	2021–2023
Jared Bernstein	2023–2025
Administrator of the Small Business Administration	Isabel Guzman	2021–2025
Director of the Office of Science and Technology Policy	Eric Lander	2021–2022
Arati Prabhakar	2022–2025
White House Chief of Staff	Ron Klain	2021–2023
Jeff Zients	2023–2025
- *Elevated to cabinet-level in July 2023

Biden was inaugurated alongside Kamala Harris, the first woman, first African American, and first Asian American vice president.

On November 11, 2020, Biden selected Ron Klain, who served as his vice presidential chief of staff, to serve as his White House chief of staff. Biden chose Jen Psaki, deputy White House press secretary and U.S. Department of State spokesperson during the presidency of Barack Obama, as his White House press secretary. Psaki announced, and has held, daily press briefings for White House reporters. On March 25, 2021, Biden held his first solo press conference after 64 days in office, unlike his most recent predecessors (back to Herbert Hoover in 1929), who all held their first solo press conferences within 33 days of taking office.

On November 17, 2020, Biden announced that he had selected Mike Donilon as senior advisor and Steve Ricchetti as counselor. Jen O'Malley Dillon, who had served as campaign manager for Biden's successful presidential campaign, was named as deputy chief of staff.

=== Cabinet ===
Biden selected Antony Blinken to be secretary of state, Linda Thomas-Greenfield as ambassador to the United Nations, and Jake Sullivan as national security advisor.

On November 23, 2020, Biden announced Alejandro Mayorkas to be his choice for Secretary of Homeland Security and Avril Haines as Director of National Intelligence. Throughout December and January, Biden continued to select cabinet members, including Marty Walsh, the then current mayor of Boston, as his Secretary of Labor.

Biden altered his cabinet structure, elevating the chair of the Council of Economic Advisers, director of the Office of Science and Technology Policy, and ambassador to the United Nations as cabinet-level positions. Biden removed the director of the Central Intelligence Agency from his official cabinet at the onset of his presidency, but he restored it to the cabinet in 2023.

While administering the oath of office to hundreds of White House officials through video conferencing, Biden called for more civility in politics, saying: "If you ever work with me and I hear you treat another colleague with disrespect, talk down to someone, I promise you I will fire you on the spot. ... No ifs, ands, or buts."

== Judicial appointments ==
Of the Article III judges nominated by Biden, 235 of them were confirmed by the United States Senate, including: one associate justice of the Supreme Court of the United States, 45 judges for the United States courts of appeals, 187 judges for the United States district courts and two judges for the United States Court of International Trade. Biden appointed the most federal judges during the first two years of any presidency since John F. Kennedy.

Notably, President Biden declined to select a nominee for a judicial vacancy on the Third Circuit in his home state of Delaware even though the vacancy was announced eight months before his term ended. Biden's decision not to fill the vacancy in his home state of Delaware on the Third Circuit and unsuccessful nomination of Adeel A. Mangi to another Third Circuit vacancy allowed President Trump to fill both seats in 2025 and flip the Third Circuit to a conservative majority.

=== United States Supreme Court nominations ===
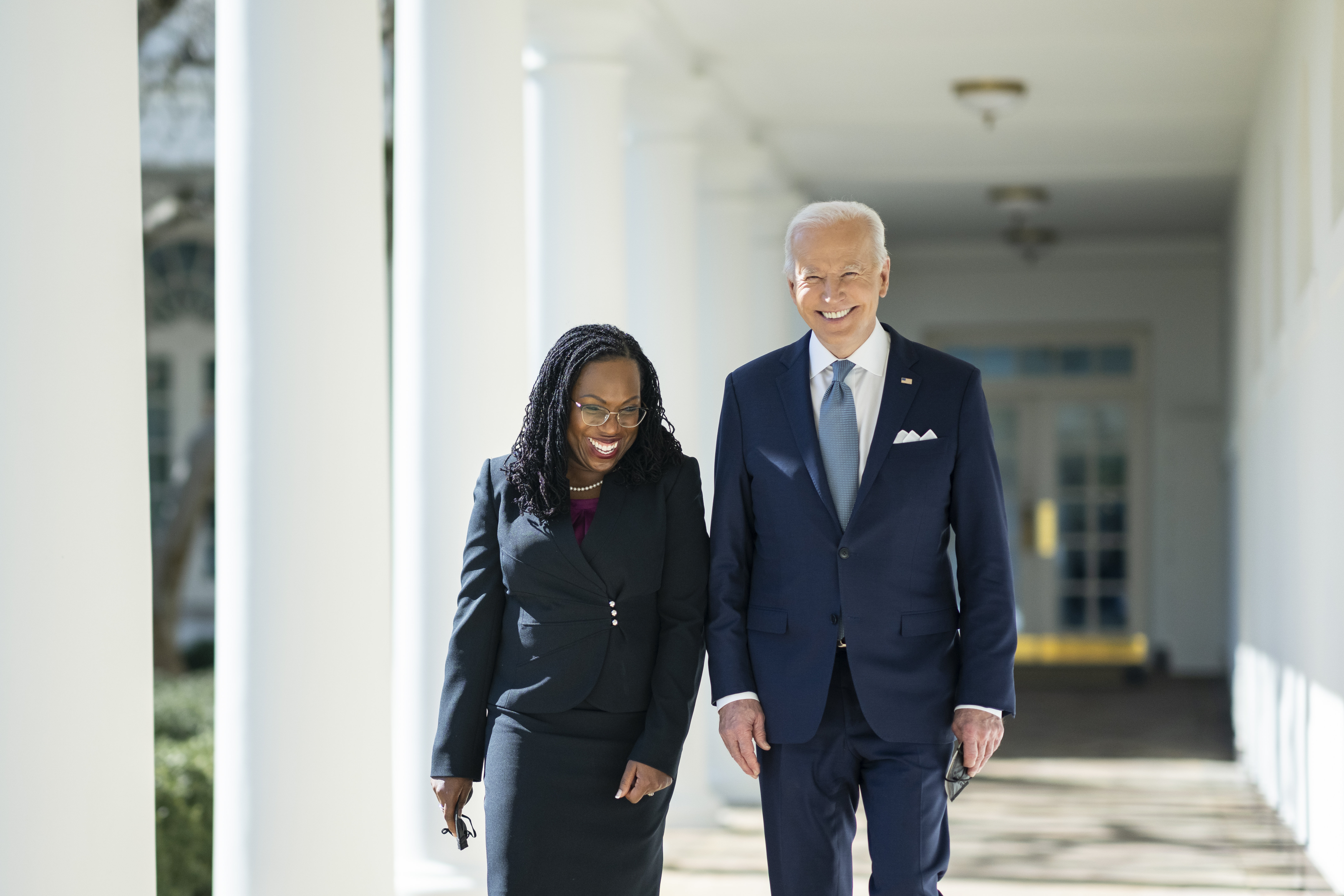
Judge Ketanji Brown Jackson with President Joe Biden in 2022

On January 26, 2022, it was reported that Justice Stephen Breyer planned to step down at the end of the court's current term, giving Biden his first opportunity to name a justice to the court. On January 27, Biden reiterated his intention to keep his campaign promise to nominate a Black woman. On February 22, it was reported that Biden had met with his top three contenders, Ketanji Brown Jackson, J. Michelle Childs and Leondra Kruger. On February 25, it was announced that Biden would nominate Judge Jackson. On April 7, 2022, Jackson was confirmed by a vote of 53–47. She was then sworn in on June 30, 2022, at noon, when Breyer's retirement went into effect.

== Domestic affairs ==
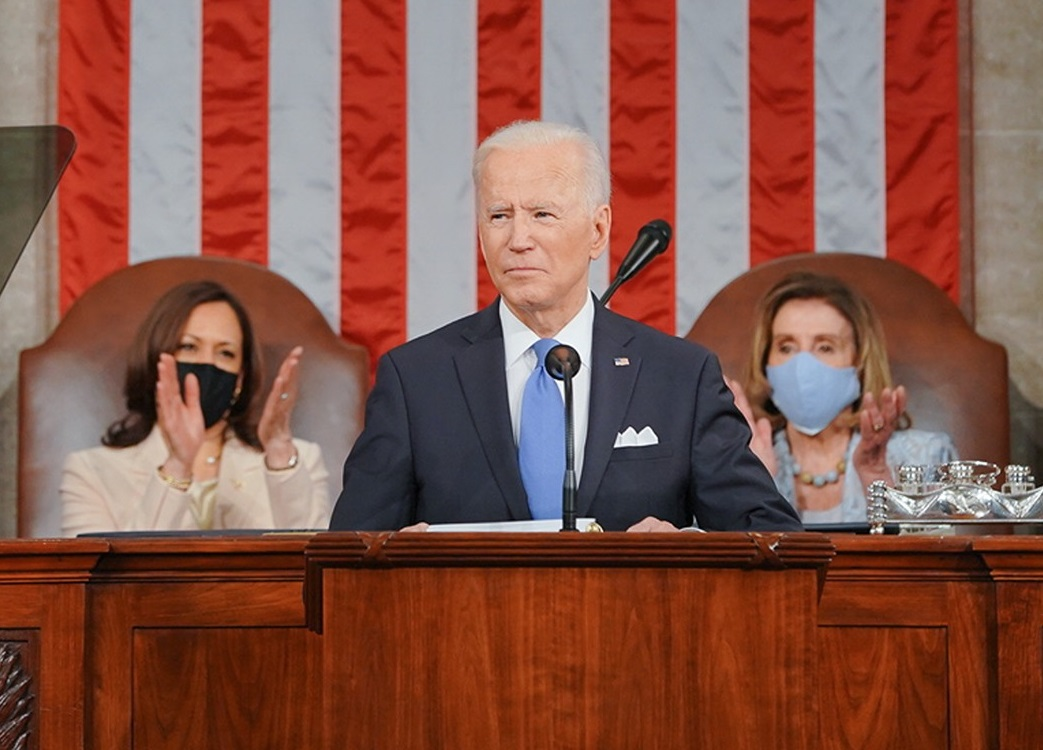
President Biden addresses a joint session of Congress, with Vice President Kamala Harris and House Speaker Nancy Pelosi, April 28, 2021.

=== Health care ===
Biden strongly campaigned for the presidency on the public option, a policy that, if enacted into law, would have offered Americans a choice between maintaining their private healthcare insurance or buying into Medicare. The idea was viewed as a compromise between the progressive and moderate flanks of the Democratic Party. The Biden campaign described the public option as a "plan to protect and build on ObamaCare".

However, shortly before taking office in January 2021, Biden's team abruptly dropped the proposal, frustrating many online progressives who already viewed the public option healthcare proposal as a failure to fight the status quo.

The Biden administration rescinded work requirements for Medicaid recipients. The administration opened a special enrollment period for the Affordable Care Act as well as extending the normal enrollment period, citing the COVID-19 pandemic. The administration provided larger premium subsidies.

In August 2022, President Biden signed into law the Inflation Reduction Act of 2022. The law allocates $64 billion for a three-year expansion of Affordable Care Act subsidies originally expanded under the American Rescue Plan Act of 2021 and $265 billion for prescription drug price reform to lower prices, including providing Medicare the authority to negotiate the prices for certain drugs with pharmaceutical companies.

That same month, Biden signed into law the Honoring our PACT Act of 2022, which expands federal health care access, services, and funding for veterans who were exposed to toxic substances during their service, including toxic smoke from burn pits.

==== Opioid epidemic ====
Drug overdoses killed 106,699 in the United States in 2021. Opioids were involved in 80,411 overdose deaths in 2021, up from around 10,000 in 1999.

In June 2023, U.S. federal prosecutors announced criminal indictments of fentanyl precursor producers in China. In October 2023, OFAC sanctioned a China-based network of fentanyl manufacturers and distributors. In 2023, the Biden administration announced a crackdown on Mexican drug cartels smuggling fentanyl into the United States.

Rahul Gupta led White House efforts to combat the opioid epidemic.

==== COVID-19 pandemic ====
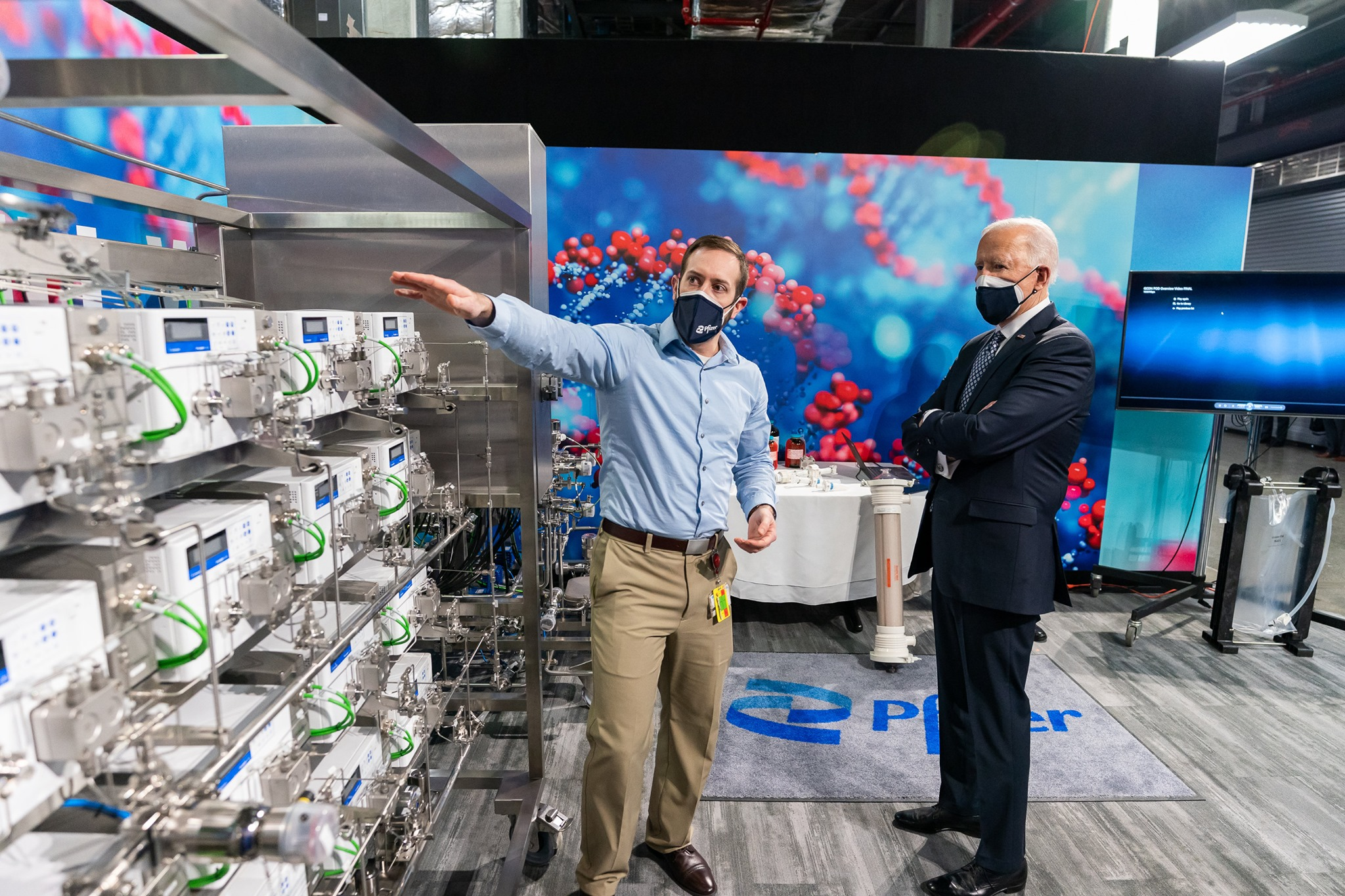
President Biden touring a vaccine manufacturing plant

On January 20, 2021, his first day as president, Biden implemented a federal mask mandate, requiring the use of masks and social distancing in all federal buildings, on federal lands, and by federal employees and contractors. Biden also signed an executive order that reversed the withdrawal of the U.S. from the World Health Organization (WHO), making Dr. Anthony Fauci the head of the delegation to the WHO. On January 21, the administration released a 200-page document titled "National Strategy for the COVID-19 Response and Pandemic Preparedness". That same day, Biden invoked the Defense Production Act to speed up the vaccination process and ensure the availability of glass vials, syringes, and other vaccine supplies at the federal level. In justifying his use of the act, Biden said: "And when I say wartime, people kind of look at me like 'wartime?' Well, as I said last night, 400,000 Americans have died. That's more than have died in all of World War II. 400,000. This is a wartime undertaking." Biden established the White House COVID-19 Response Team, a White House Office dedicated to coordinating a unified federal government response.

According to a report by Reuters, in mid-2021 the Biden administration ended a military-run propaganda campaign to spread disinformation about the Sinovac Chinese COVID-19 vaccine which had begun in 2020 during the Trump administration. The campaign was described as "payback" for COVID-19 disinformation by China directed against the U.S. Primarily targeting people in the Philippines, the campaign used fake social media accounts to spread disinformation, including that the Sinovac vaccine contained pork-derived ingredients and was therefore haram under Islamic law.

On January 21, 2021, Biden signed ten executive orders pertaining to the COVID-19 pandemic. In order to meet his vaccination goal of a hundred million shots in his first 100 days in office, Biden signed an executive order increasing needed supplies. Biden signed an order on January 21 that directed FEMA to offer full reimbursements to states for the cost of using their own National Guard personnel and emergency supplies such as Personal Protective Equipment in schools. On January 24, 2021, Biden reinstated a travel ban imposed by President Trump on Brazil, United Kingdom, Ireland, South Africa, and 26 other European countries. The travel ban prevents non-U.S. citizens living in the prospective countries from entering the U.S. Biden implemented a face mask requirement on nearly all forms of public transportation and inside of transportation hubs; previously, the Centers for Disease Control and Prevention (CDC) had recommended that such a policy be enacted but it was blocked by the Trump administration, under which the CDC issued strong, albeit non-binding recommendations for mask use in these settings.

In mid-March 2021, Biden dismissed a request by the European Union to export unused COVID-19 vaccines from AstraZeneca out of the U.S. even though the manufacturer endorsed it and vowed to resupply the doses. The rationale for this decision, which contributed to low European vaccination rates, was that the U.S. had to be "over-supplied and over-prepared", according to White House press secretary Jen Psaki. Whereas the U.S. exported no vaccines, the European Union exported 77 million doses to the world from December 2020 to March 2021. Eventually, the U.S. reversed course and gave vaccine doses from AstraZeneca to Mexico, Canada, and Japan by the end of March.

On May 6, 2021, the Biden administration announced that it supports waiving patent protections on existing COVID-19 vaccines so that other countries can produce generic variants, after weeks of pressure from the international community. On May 7, French president Emmanuel Macron called on the U.S. "to put an end to export bans not only on vaccines but on vaccine ingredients, which prevent production."

On May 26, 2021, Biden ordered U.S. intelligence agencies to increase their investigations into the origin of the virus, after reports that researchers at the Wuhan Institute of Virology became ill a month before the pandemic began.

In July 2021, amid a slowing of the COVID-19 vaccination rate in the country and the spread of the SARS-CoV-2 Delta variant, Biden said that the U.S. has "a pandemic for those who haven't gotten the vaccination" and that it was therefore "gigantically important" for Americans to be vaccinated, touting the vaccines' effectiveness against hospitalizations and deaths from COVID-19. He also criticized the prevalence of COVID-19 misinformation on social media, saying it was "killing people".

Despite months of vaccine availability and incentives, by September many Americans continued to resist vaccination amid rising cases in several states, hampering prospects towards herd immunity. On September 9, Biden stated, "We've been patient. But our patience is wearing thin, and your refusal has cost all of us." That day he issued an executive order directing businesses with more than 100 employees to require vaccination of their workers or weekly testing, affecting about 80 million Americans. The order also required the roughly 17 million employees of health facilities receiving federal Medicare or Medicaid to be vaccinated. Many Republicans asserted Biden's order was an unconstitutional overreach of federal authority, and some Republican governors said they would sue to block it.

The Biden administration responded to the global spread of the SARS-CoV-2 Omicron variant in December 2021 by advocating response by the states instead of the federal government. Throughout the surge, the Biden administration has been criticized for a lack of COVID-19 tests, exacerbating the spread of the Omicron variant. When questioned about the apparent shortage of tests, Jen Psaki replied, "Should we just send one to every American? Then what happens if every American has one test? How much does that cost and what happens after that?", causing backlash. The Biden administration responded by promising an increased supply of at-home tests later in 2022.

In the midst of an all-time high of new COVID-19 cases, the Centers for Disease Control revised their guidelines, recommending five days of quarantine rather than ten without requiring a negative COVID-19 test. This move was criticized by health experts who worry that without rapid testing, COVID-positive people may unknowingly spread COVID-19 in workplaces under the recommended CDC guidelines. Others criticize the CDC for implementing this change after lobbying by Delta Air Lines, leading to social media backlash against the federal government.

==== Cancer research ====
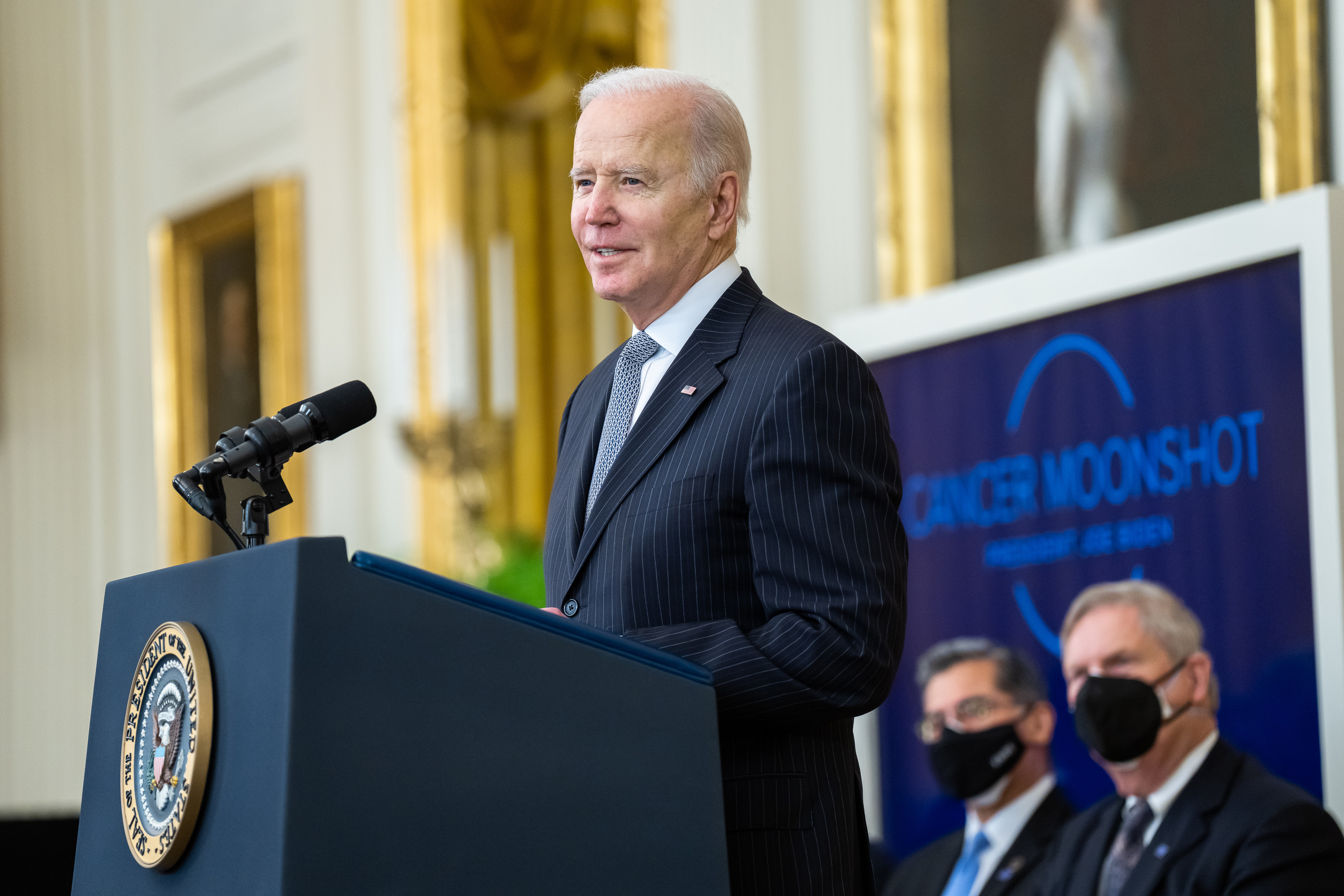
President Biden announces the revival of the Beau Biden Cancer Moonshot, February 2, 2022.

Biden gave a speech at the John F. Kennedy Presidential Library and Museum on September 12, 2022, the 60th anniversary of Kennedy's We Choose to Go to the Moon speech, promoting his administration's revival of the Beau Biden Cancer Moonshot, including the new Advanced Research Projects Agency for Health.

=== Economy ===
The New Republic praised Biden's economic record in July 2024, highlighting record low unemployment which had led to an increase in wages at the lower end of the wage distribution as workers had more bargaining power. However, overall real median full-time wages stagnated throughout his time in office. The wealthiest 0.1% of Americans further expanded their share of household wealth from 13.2% to 13.8%, continuing the trend of the previous decades. While inflation was painful, it has returned near its pre-pandemic rate and was similar to peer countries, though the U.S. economy has grown faster than its peers. The expansion of the Affordable Care Act, the child tax credit, $1400 stimulus checks, and the expansion of SNAP benefits boosted balance sheets for low and middle-income Americans. New business formation rose 30% from pre-pandemic levels, and was notably strong among women. Biden also signed three major pieces of longer-term economic legislation to repair infrastructure like roads, bridges and water pipes, boost semiconductor investment, and expand green energy.

In February 2024, the total federal government debt grew to $34.4 trillion after having grown by approximately $1 trillion in both of two separate 100-day periods since the previous June.

==== Build Back Better Plan ====
The Build Back Better Plan was a proposed framework of public investment in social, infrastructural, and environmental programs. It was eventually divided into three parts. The American Rescue Plan was focused on COVID-19 pandemic relief, and was passed and signed into law in March 2021 as the American Rescue Plan Act of 2021. The second part called for investment in infrastructure and addressing climate change, and was called the American Jobs Plan. Elements of the American Jobs Plan were the basis for the Infrastructure Investment and Jobs Act, signed into law in November 2021. The third part, the American Families Plan, proposed investment in social policies, such as paid parental leave. The American Families Plan was merged with elements of the American Jobs Plan to form the Build Back Better Act, introduced in September 2021. This passed the House of Representatives, but failed to pass the Senate. Continued negotiations led to a new proposal, the Inflation Reduction Act of 2022 which included proposals addressing climate change, healthcare, and tax reform proposals while excluding Build Back Better's social safety net proposals. This was passed and signed into law in August 2022.

==== Consumer price reductions ====
The administration also pursued lower drug prices by allowing Medicare to negotiate the prices it pays and capping the price of insulin.

In 2024, Biden pushed to limit junk fees through the FTC, FCC and CFPB.

Biden took antitrust enforcement more seriously than several of his immediate predecessors, as reflected in the work of Lina Khan at the FTC, a historic court victory against Google's search monopoly, and a lawsuit to break-up Live Nation and Ticketmaster.

In August 2024, the DOJ sued RealPage under allegations that the company's software allowed client landlords to algorithmically fix rents at rates higher than what would be expected in a competitive market.

===== Prescription medication =====
The Inflation Reduction Act, signed into law on August 16, 2022, authorizes the Centers for Medicare & Medicaid Services to directly negotiate a maximum fair price with drug manufacturers for specific expensive drugs under Medicare Part D, slashing out-of-pocket costs for beneficiaries covered by Medicare, whilst reducing government expenditure by upwards of $100 billion over ten years, and raising revenue from rebates from manufacturers who raise prices faster than the rate of inflation, effectively penalizing price gouging.

The first series of ten drugs to be selected by the CMS for price negotiation were Januvia, which was reduced from a 30-day price of $527 to $113, a number of drugs manufactured by Novo Nordisk, from $495 to $119, Farxiga, from $556 to $178.50, Enbrel, from $7,106 to $2,355, Jardiance, from $573 to $197, Stelara, from $13,836 to $4,695, Xarelto, from $517 to $197, Eliquis, from $521 to $231, Entresto, from $628 to $295, and Imbruvica, from $14,934 to $9,319. This series first went into effect on January 1, 2026.

The CMS announced the second slate of fifteen drugs to be negotiated downwards in price on January 17, 2025. This slate includes Ozempic, Rybelsus and Wegovy, all manufactured by Novo Nordisk, each negotiated down from a 30-day price of $959 to $274, Trelegy Ellipta, from $654 to $175, Xtandi, from $13,480 to $7,004, Pomalyst, from $21,744 to $8,650, Ofev, from $12,622 to $6,350, Ibrance, $15,741 to $7,871, Linzess, from $539 to $136, Calquence, from $14,228 to $8,600, Austedo and Austedo XR, from $6,623 to $4,093, Breo Ellipta, from $397 to $67, Xifaxan, from $2,696 to $1,000, Vraylar, from $1,376 to $770, Tradjenta, from $688 to $78, Janumet and Janumet XR, from $526 to $80, and Otezla and Otezla XR, from $4,722 to $1,650. These negotiations are scheduled to go into effect on January 1, 2027.

In 2026, the CMS announced the next round of price negotiation for fifteen prescription drugs covered by both Medicare Part B and Medicare Part D. These drugs are Trulicity, Biktarvy, Orencia, Cosentyx, Erleada, Kisqali, Entyvio, Verzenio, Botox, Lenvima, Xolair, Rexulti, Xeljanz and Xeljanz XR, Anoro Ellipta, and Cimzia.

In total, coverage of the selected prescription drugs account for approximately 36% of all Medicare Part B and Part D annual expenditures, and reducing their prices would permit large reductions in government expenditure, not just cost-of-living reductions for Medicare recipients.

The Act also contains provisions to cap insulin prices for seniors enrolled on Medicare to $35 per month, and limit out-of-pocket prescription drug costs at $2,000 annually. The original version of the Act had a provision that penalized drug price increases that exceeded the rate of inflation for privately insured beneficiaries, but was struck from the Act by the Parliamentarian of the United States Senate due to not being a budget-related provision eligible to be passed via budget reconciliation.

===== American Rescue Plan Act of 2021 =====
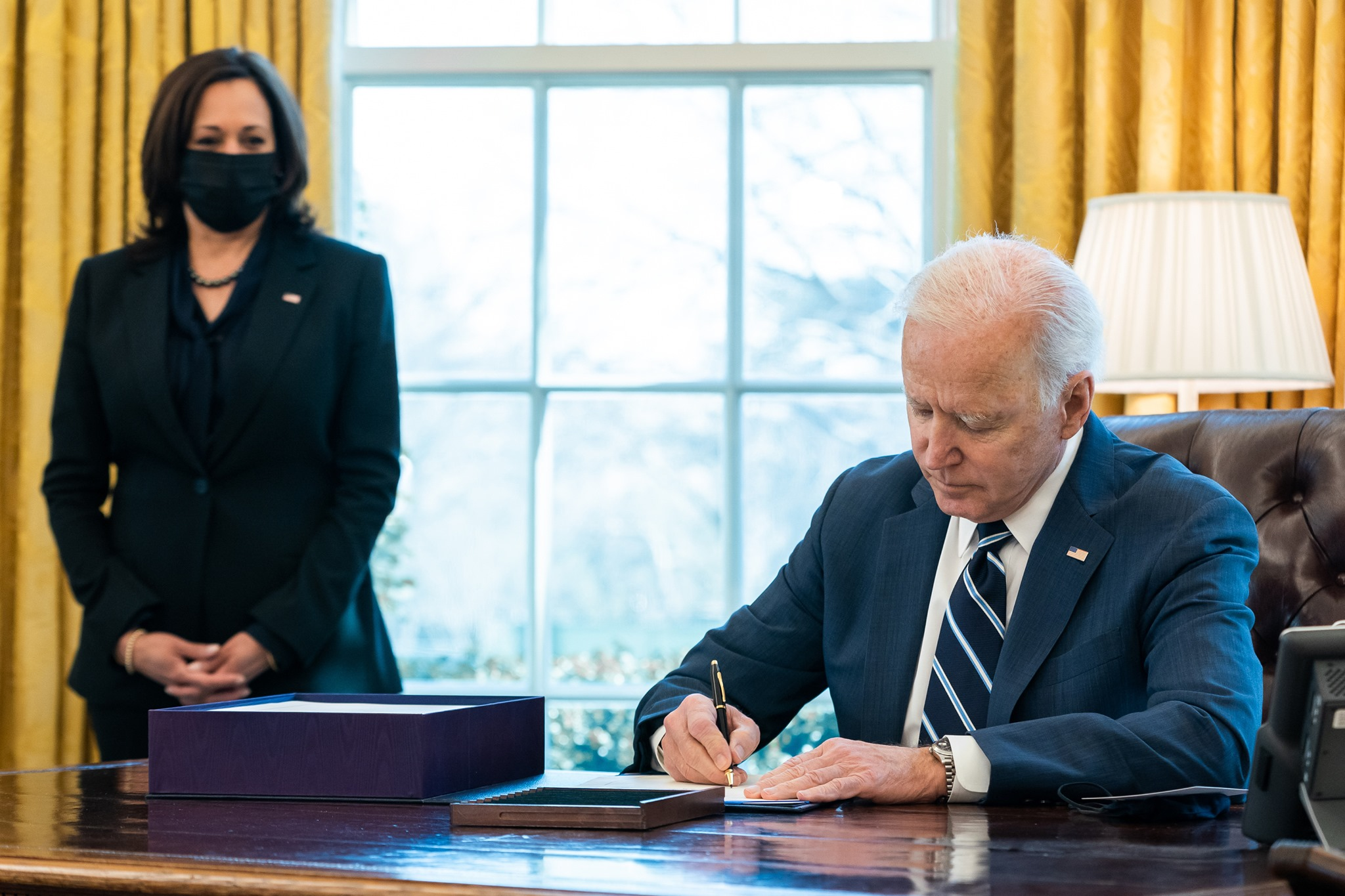
President Biden signs the American Rescue Plan Act of 2021 into law, March 11, 2021.

On January 14, 2021, Biden revealed a $1.9 trillion stimulus bill, the American Rescue Plan Act of 2021. The plan includes $1 trillion in direct aid, including $1,400 per-person checks, for working Americans, and would provide for direct housing and nutrition assistance, expanding access to safe and reliable childcare and affordable healthcare, increasing the minimum wage, extending unemployment insurance, and giving families with kids and childless workers an emergency boost this year. It would also expand the eligibility of these checks to adult dependents who have been left out of previous rounds of relief. The plan additionally includes $440 billion in community support, providing $350 billion of community support to first responders while the rest goes to grants for small businesses and transit agencies; $400 billion for a national vaccination plan and school reopenings; and $10 billion for information technology, modernizing federal cybersecurity infrastructure. In her first press briefing, press secretary Psaki said the plan was likely to change as negotiations continued, with the provision to increase the minimum wage later being excluded from the relief plan. Biden signed the Plan into law on March 11, 2021, passing through both chambers of Congress with a party-line vote.

The plan invokes the Defense Production Act of 1950 to ensure the production of personal protective equipment, glass vials, syringes, and other supplies exceeds the demand. It allows partners of states to create vaccine centers in stadiums, convention centers and pharmacies. The federal government would identify communities that have been hit hardest by COVID-19, and ensure the vaccine does not reach them at an unfair pace. In addition, the plan would launch a national campaign to educate Americans about the vaccine and COVID-19, targeting misinformation related to the pandemic. Vaccines would also be freely available to all citizens regardless of immigration status. In Biden's plan, he would issue a national testing strategy that attempts to mitigate the spread of COVID-19 by increasing laboratory capacity and expanding testing. The plan would also develop new treatments for COVID-19.

===== American Families Plan =====
On April 28, during Biden's speech to Congress he unveiled the American Families Plan, a roughly $1.8 trillion proposal to significantly increase federal spending in areas related to childcare, paid leave, pre-kindergarten, community college, and healthcare. It is considered to be the third part of Biden's "Build Back Better" agenda (the first being the American Rescue Plan and the second being the American Jobs Plan). The bill was effectively merged with climate change and other provisions that didn't make it into the Infrastructure Investment and Jobs Act, for a total $3.5 trillion Build Back Better Act. However, the bill did not have Republican support, and Democrats struggled to win the support of Senator Joe Manchin of West Virginia to pass it on a party-line vote through budget reconciliation, even as the price was lowered to $2.2 trillion. After the bill ultimately failed to match his envisioned cost, Manchin publicly rejected it, dooming its passage.

==== Labor ====
On January 22, 2021, Biden signed an executive order that removed schedule F, overturning a number of Trump's policies that limited the collective bargaining power of federal unions. Biden's executive order also promotes a $15 minimum wage for federal workers and repeals three of Trump's executive orders which made the employee discipline process stricter and restricted union representatives' access to office space. As well as promoting a $15 minimum wage, Biden's executive order increases the amount of money going to the families of children who are missing meals because of school closures due to the pandemic by 15%. The repealing of Trump's three executive orders comes as the orders were used to transfer civil servants and career scientists and replace them with employees friendly to the Trump administration.

On inauguration day 2021, Biden fired pro-business Peter Robb, then general counsel of the National Labor Relations Board, replacing him with pro-union Jennifer Abruzzo in February 2021. Biden's NLRB has pursued action against Starbucks' and Amazon's alleged anti-union activities. On August 24, 2023, the NLRB reinstated Obama-era policies regarding union elections, speeding up the timeline by removing restrictions such as resolving litigation before holding an election.

In late 2022, Biden signed a bill forcing an agreement between union workers and rail companies in order to prevent a strike, earning him criticism from progressives and rail workers. Afterwards, Biden pressured the rail companies to offer paid sick leave to workers, which had been a key demand in the original planned strike. More than 60% of rail workers had sick leave agreements in June 2023.

On August 8, 2023, the Biden administration issued new guidelines governing how the prevailing wages that are used to set a wage floor under the Davis-Bacon Act of 1931 are calculated for federally-funded public works projects; under the new rule, the prevailing wage would be equal to the wage paid to at least 30% of workers in an area, or the weighted average of all wages in the area if no single wage rate covers at least 30% of workers, reversing a rule set by the Reagan administration in 1982 that replaced this rule with a 50% rule. The administration argued that this would have the effect of raising wages for construction workers because, under the Reagan-era rule, since a single wage rate is unlikely to be paid to at least 50% of workers, contractors would default to using the average wage, which could be brought down by privately funded projects that recompense workers with an atypically low pay, while wage rates covering over 30% of workers are more common and correspond to higher collectively bargained rates. However, this rule was blocked by district judge Sam Cummings on June 24, 2024.

On the 2023 United Auto Workers strike, Biden repeated union leader Shawn Fain's motto "record profits, record contracts" and expressed support for the workers in negotiations. Biden assigned two White House officials to aid in negotiation efforts, senior adviser Gene Sperling and acting Labor Secretary Julie Su. On September 26, Biden joined striking UAW workers on the picket line in Michigan, becoming the first president to do so.

On April 23, 2024, the Department of Labor issued a rule raising the cap on mandatory overtime pay for salaried workers to $58,600 per year, up from $35,500 in 2020, which would extend benefits to over four million extra salary workers. It was challenged by business and conservative groups in court, led by Texas Attorney General Ken Paxton, and subsequently overturned later that year, before being rescinded by the second Trump administration.

Additionally, on the same day, Biden administration officials, including National Economic Advisor Lael Brainard and Acting Secretary of Labor Julie Su, convened leaders from five major pension fund managers, including the New York State Common Retirement Fund and the California Public Employees' Retirement System, to announce an initiative buttressing robust labor standards from private equity investments in the portfolios of these capital funds, including promoting unionization and neutrality to union drives, workplace safety standards, and the elimination of the use of forced labor and illegal child labor.

Biden became the first US president to run for election with a unionized campaign staff for his 2024 election run.

The Biden administration helped to resolve the 2024 United States port strike.

===== 2022 United States railroad labor dispute =====
The rise of precision scheduled railroading is controversial has led to longer and more irregular working hours, tighter schedules, longer trains, supply chain delays, higher frequency of train derailments, depreciated safety standards, staffing and budget cuts, increased workloads per employee, and cuts to railroad infrastructure maintenance. Additionally, BNSF Railway adopted a new attendance policy called "Hi-Viz", which unions alleged penalized taking sick time-off and incentivized coming to work while ill. These policies eliminate any free time which workers have, requiring them to be effectively on-call for weeks at a time.

The embattled management philosophy had been under dispute between a coalition of twelve railroad labor unions representing over 115,000 railroad workers, known as the Coordinated Bargaining Coalition, and the National Carriers Conference Committee, collating six Class I rail carriers bargaining together, Union Pacific, Norfolk Southern, CSX, BNSF, Kansas City Southern Railway, and Canadian National, while Amtrak and Canadian Pacific bargained separately, with pay raises, paid sick leave, labor protections and better working conditions on the table.

Negotiations extended for more than two years, wending from 2019 and through early 2022, with very little progress made, and ultimately reached an impasse, with workers in the Brotherhood of Locomotive Engineers and Trainmen voting to authorize a strike later that year, and the International Association of Sheet Metal, Air, Rail, and Transportation Workers threatening a strike in turn. However, growing fears that a railroad strike could lead to further supply chain failure amidst already present supply chain issues ahead of the holidays that could deepen and agitate existing inflationary pressures exerted immense political pressures upon the president and Congress to intercede in the negotiations, and invoke the Railway Labor Act to preclude a possible strike.

In accordance with the Railway Labor Act, President Biden convened a three-person Presidential Emergency Board with Executive Order 14077 on July 20, 2022. The Board issued a report one month later, starting a 30-day cooling off period that prevents any strikes or lockouts, and recommending "annual wage increases of between 4% and 7% through 2024" in addition to retroactive pay increases, one extra paid day off, and five $1,000 annual bonuses.

However, while ten unions accepted the terms of the deal, some considered it to be insufficient and prepared to strike anyway. Near the end of the cool-off period, Biden and Secretary of Labor Marty Walsh engaged in twenty consecutive hours of talks with union leader and railroad representatives in the Department of Labor. These negotiations resulted in an updated deal, including a 24% increase in wages from 2020 through 2024, necessitating an automatic average payout of $11,000 to encompass retroactive wage hikes, a five-year $5,000 bonus, a cap on monthly health care contributions, more flexible schedules, like unpaid time off for medical appointments and exemptions from attendance policies for hospitalizations and surgical procedures, as well as the ability for unions to negotiate more regular schedules for engineers and conductors in future contracts. However, the deal only provided one day of paid sick leave, to the dismay of union leaders and workers, who desired fifteen days, and as a result strike fears still loomed from holdout unions.

Congressional Democratic leaders wished not to intervene in further negotiations, not even to extend the cool-off period, with House Majority Leader Nancy Pelosi remarking that "[they would] rather see negotiations prevail so there’s no need for any actions from Congress," while Senate Democrats and Independent Bernie Sanders defeated a Republican-led bill to impose the terms of the Presidential Emergency Board's advice. But with freight railroads refusing to budge on paid sick leave, and pressures from the fallout of a potential strike growing, Biden called for his party to capitulate and agree to instate the deal from September, which they ultimately did, though House Democrats attempted to simultaneously pass an amended version with seven days of paid sick leave, which was blocked by the Senate due to a lack of Republican support. The bill was signed into law on December 2, 2022.

Afterwards, Biden administration officials, including Pete Buttigieg, Marty Walsh and Biden himself, continued to lobby railroad companies to accede to unions' demands for paid sick leave. Eventually, the major railroads reached similar agreements with various unions to allow workers have a minimum of four days of paid sick leave, and the option to convert three personal days into paid sick leave days, in the months following, mostly resolving the dispute after years of negotiation, though precision scheduled railroading was still the rule of the land. The Railroad Department Director of International Brotherhood of Electrical Workers, Alphonse Russo, thanked the Biden administration for its help in the negotiations.

The percentage of workers with access to paid sick leave increased from barely above 0% before the deal, to approximately 60% of the railroad workforce, and onwards to above 90% by the middle of 2024, though the administration called on railroad companies to ensure that the remaining 10% of uncovered railroad employees were given access to paid sick leave.

==== Antitrust law enforcement ====
Federal agencies under the Biden administration enforced antitrust laws more vigorously than seen in previous administrations ever since the Chicago school of economics supplanted the structuralist thought of the early 20th century. This shift was embodied by the administration's embrace of the New Brandeis school of antitrust enforcement, represented by Biden's appointment of Lina Khan as the Chair of the Federal Trade Commission, Jonathan Kanter to serve as the Assistant Attorney General for the United States Department of Justice Antitrust Division of the United States Department of Justice, and Tim Wu to serve as the special assistant to the president for technology and competition policy on the President's National Economic Council, among others.

Biden signed Executive Order 14036 on July 9, 2021, directing federal agencies to cooperatively engage a seventy-two point "whole-of-government" plan impounding aggressive enforcement of antitrust legislation and jurisprudence to defeat domestic market consolidation and the creation of monopolies or cartels across multiple industries, which he believes will foster competition and innovation, decrease costs, combat exploitative pricing, increase consumer flexibility and buying power, and allow workers to better negotiate for fairer wages or working conditions, or seek higher-paying jobs in the event of impasse. The executive order accordingly created a White House Competition Council, which would "coordinate, promote, and advance Federal Government efforts to address overconcentration, monopolization, and unfair competition in or directly affecting the American economy."

The Department of Justice and Federal Trade Commission adopted a more hardline stance on large mergers, reflected in the updated agency guidelines issued in late 2023. The FTC took action against at least thirty-eight mergers between June 2021 and November 2023, with the FTC authorizing staff to file an administrative complaint or seek a preliminary injunction in federal court to halt the progress of these mergers. In half of these mergers, the parties involved abandoned their plans after the FTC issued its complaint. In one, the parties structurally modified the terms of the merger and sold off numerous assets in order to comply with existing antitrust legislation in response to the threat of litigation. In another, the parties agreed to a consent order prohibiting them from engaging in the conduct alleged by the FTC. Another fourteen mergers beyond these were abandoned during the FTC's investigation, and with another fourteen, the FTC ordered a series of divestitures to prevent the mergers from resulting in harm to the markets.

The Federal Trade Commission brought to trial four times as many billion-dollar merger challenges between 2021 and late 2024 than it did in the period between 2017 and 2021, and 2008 and 2017. A significantly larger proportion of merger challenges between 2021 and late 2024 ended in the merge attempt being abandoned compared to the 2017-21 interval and 2016 by a factor of nearly three, exceeding the total number of abandoned mergers of the preceding decade.

==== Banking ====
After the Collapse of Silicon Valley Bank in 2023, Biden expressed opposition to a bailout that was borne by taxpayers. He also claimed that the partial roll-back of Dodd-Frank regulations contributed to the bank failures.

==== Domestic manufacturing ====
Biden signed an executive order intended to support domestic manufacturers by increasing a federal preference for purchasing goods made wholly or partly in the U.S. Using the broad term "Made in America laws", the executive order's stated goal is to strengthen "all statutes, regulations, rules, and Executive Orders relating to Federal financial assistance awards or Federal procurement, including those that refer to 'Buy America' or 'Buy American.'"

On August 9, 2022, Biden actively promoted and signed into law the CHIPS and Science Act, which authorized $52 billion for domestic semiconductor research and manufacturing. On August 16, 2022, Biden signed the Inflation Reduction Act of 2022 into law, which included provisions to support the domestic production of solar panels, wind turbines, and other infrastructure. Due to incentives from the CHIPS and Science Act, Micron Technology will invest billions in new semiconductor manufacturing in New York.

==== Trade ====
In 2021 The Wall Street Journal reported that instead of negotiating access to Chinese markets for large American financial-service firms and pharmaceutical companies, the Biden administration might focus on trade policies that boost exports or domestic jobs. U.S. Trade Representative Katherine Tai said the administration wants a "worker-centered trade policy". U.S. Secretary of Commerce Gina Raimondo aggressively enforced trade rules to combat unfair practices by China.

In March 2021, in her first interview since taking office, U.S. Trade Representative Tai told The Wall Street Journal the U.S. would not lift tariffs on Chinese imports (implemented under the Trump administration as urged by Peter Navarro) in the near future, despite lobbying efforts from "free traders" including former U.S. Secretary of Treasury Hank Paulson and the Business Roundtable, a big-business group in the U.S., that pressed for tariff repeal.

In 2021, the U.S. suspended its diplomatic trade engagement with Myanmar after a rise in violence perpetrated by the Burmese military against anti-coup protesters.

In May 2024, the Biden administration raised tariffs on Chinese imports, including a doubling for solar cells; tripling for lithium-ion electric vehicle batteries; and increases for steel, aluminum, and medical equipment. This marks the first time that critical minerals, including rare earth magnets—key components in electric and hybrid vehicles—have been specifically included in the tariffs. China produces and refines over 90 percent of the world's rare earth material. The tariff increases will be phased in over a period of three years.

==== Infrastructure ====
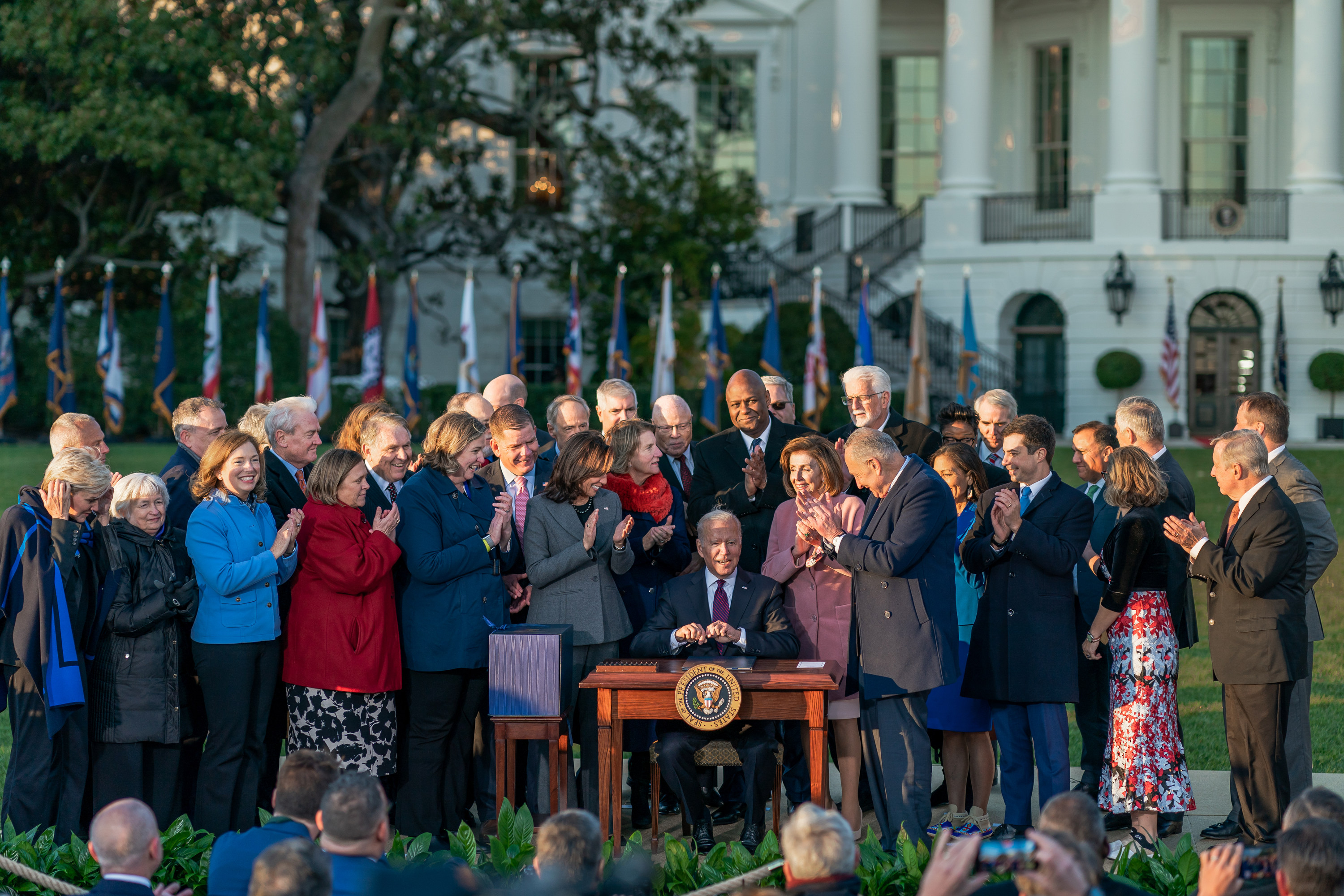
President Biden signs the Infrastructure Investment and Jobs Act into law, November 15, 2021.

As a part of the Build Back Better Plan, the Biden administration aimed for massive spending on the nation's infrastructure on the order of $2 trillion. Several of the physical infrastructure provisions featured in the proposal were included in the Infrastructure Investment and Jobs Act. Biden signed the Act into law on November 15, 2021.

This final version included approximately $1.2 trillion in spending, with $550 billion in spending authorized for "new" infrastrucutre projects on top of $660 billion in funds appropriated by Congress for work on existing infrastructure through reauthorizations and expansions of older federal-aid programs. The bill included $7.5 billion for electric vehicle charging. As of March 2024, seven charging stations with a total of 38 spots for charging vehicles had been built.

==== Inflation ====
Longer-term variables that preceded the pandemic and contributed to the rise in inflation include structural housing shortages, impacts of climate change on food, energy and home insurance prices, as well as the size of government debt and deficits.

In the midst of recovery from COVID-19, inflation rose to the highest rate in forty years peaking at 9.1% in 2022, with many other major global economies reaching similar level. Biden stated during his first State of the Union Address on March 1, 2022, that addressing inflation was his "top priority", while touting an anti-inflation plan that he said would address ocean shipping costs and prescription drug prices.

The 2022 Russian invasion of Ukraine resulted in increases in food and energy prices.

At the end of 2023, the U.S. Census Bureau found that without housing inflation, inflation would have been just 1.8%, instead of 3.2%. Katy O'Donnell of Politico argued that housing shortages, caused by artificial scarcity driven by NIMBYism, had been the single-biggest contributor to inflation. Freddie Mac estimated that the housing shortage surged 52% between 2018 and 2020. Between 2020 and 2023 climate-change exacerbated home insurance premiums in the U.S. by 33%. July 2024 data showed that inflation had dropped to 2.9%, with rising rents and childcare costs as the main drivers.

Most economists surveyed by the WSJ in July 2024 found that inflation would be worse under a second Trump administration compared to a second Biden term, due in part to tariffs, a crack down on illegal immigration, and larger deficits.

==== Taxation ====
Biden changed the practice of IRS agents disproportionately auditing lower-income Americans.

Finance officials from 130 countries agreed on July 1, 2021, to plans for a new international taxation policy. All the major economies agreed to pass national laws that would require corporations to pay at least 15% income tax in the countries they operate. This new policy would end the practice of locating world headquarters in small countries with very low taxation rates. Governments hope to recoup some of the lost revenue, estimated at $100 billion to $240 billion each year. The new system was promoted by the Biden administration and the Organisation for Economic Co-operation and Development (OECD). Secretary-General Mathias Cormann of the OECD said: "This historic package will ensure that large multinational companies pay their fair share of tax everywhere."

=== Energy, environment, and climate ===
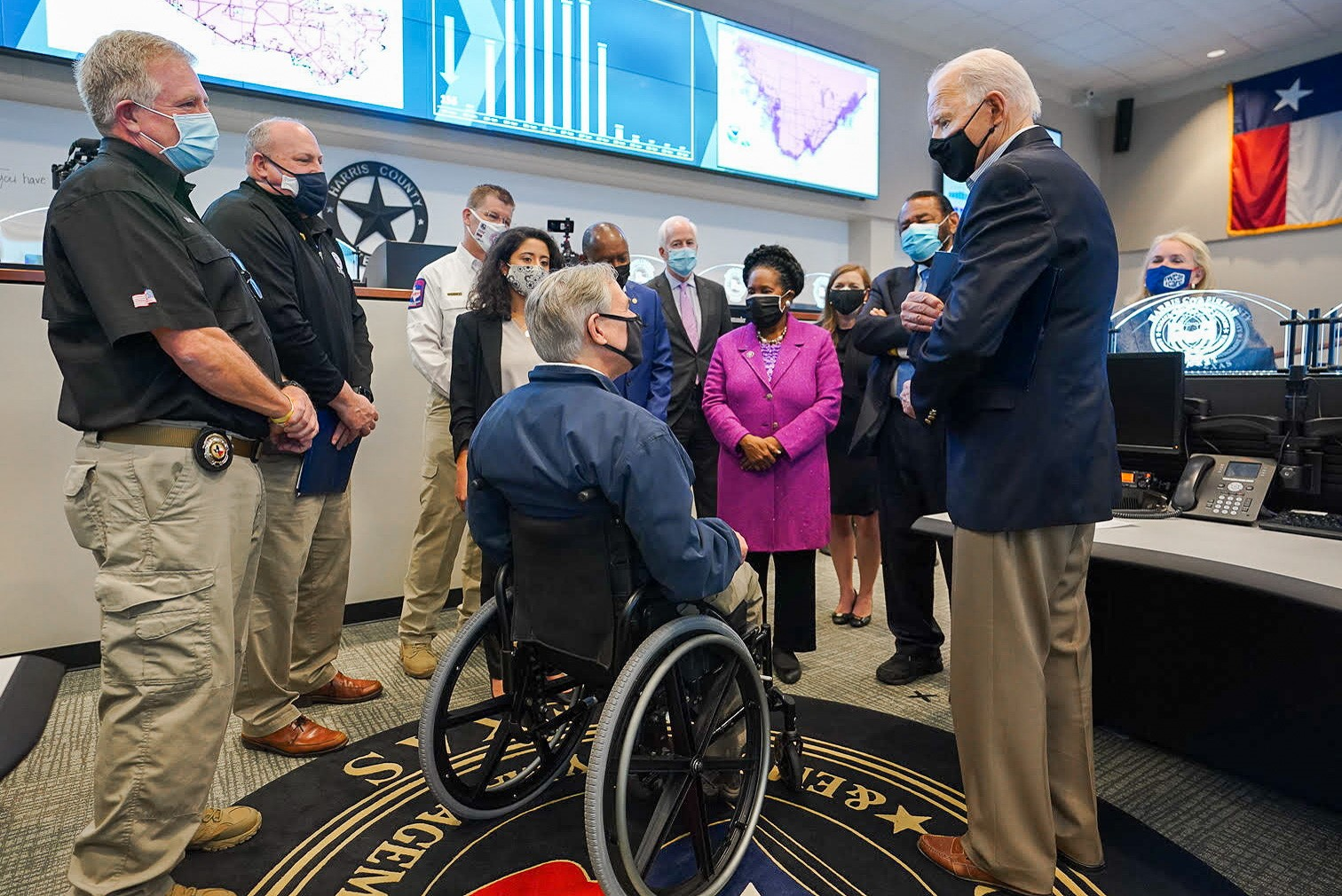
President Biden and Texas governor Greg Abbott visit the Harris County Emergency Operations Center in Houston after the 2021 Texas power crisis, February 2021.

==== General ====
During his first week in office, Biden established the position of White House National Climate Advisor, appointing environmental health and air quality expert Gina McCarthy to the role. Biden also created the position of U.S. Special Presidential Envoy for Climate, appointing former secretary of state John Kerry.

On January 20, 2021, Biden signed an executive order rejoining the U.S. to the Paris Agreement. With the U.S. rejoining the agreement, countries responsible for two-thirds of the global greenhouse gas emissions would make pledges of becoming carbon neutral, while without United States it is only half. On the same day, Biden also issued an executive order that cancelled the construction of the Keystone XL pipeline, an extension of the Keystone Pipeline. The pipeline was heavily criticized by environmental and Native American activists and groups. This order also directed agencies to review and reverse more than 100 actions made by Trump on the environment.

On March 27, 2021, Biden invited more than forty world leaders for a climate summit.

In August 2022, Biden signed the Inflation Reduction Act of 2022 into law, a domestic spending bill born out of continued negotiations on the Build Back Better Act after its collapse that fulfilled some of its initial provisions. The bill included significant federal investment in domestic clean energy production, combating climate change, and healthcare; it aims to reduce U.S. carbon emissions by 40% from peak 2005 levels by 2030, included a three-year extension of Affordable Care Act subsidies, and empowered Medicare to begin negotiating lower prescription drug costs for the first time.

In May 2022, the White House Council on Environmental Quality released a report in which it describes how Biden's administration followed the around 200 recommendations of the White House Environmental Justice Advisory Council. The full report has around 150 pages. The report summarizes many of the steps taken by the administration on environmental issues. Among others, it mentions significant achievements in the domains of energy efficiency, weatherization, transit-oriented development, walking, cycling, mixed-use development, cooperation with Indigenous peoples of the Americas.

In April 2024 Biden delivered $20 billion to eight environmental NGOs. The aim is to reduce the country's CO_{2} emissions by 40 million tonnes per year with the money, while giving 70% of the benefits to low income communities. In the same month, the American Climate Corps is expected to begin function with several hundred members. The tasks will probably be "things like installing solar panels, restoring vulnerable habitats, and fire hazard prevention." Biden plans increase the number of participants to 20,000 during the first year and then 50,000 more will be added each year by 2031. However, this plan is opposed by Republicans.

In May 2024, the administration announced guidelines around carbon markets. They push for increased verifiability from suppliers and transparency from buyers. The guidelines are not binding or enforceable.

In November 2024, the Biden administration withheld federal funding from Climate Justice Alliance, a move which CJA and The Intercept connected to its support for a ceasefire in Gaza and other progressive policy issues that had made it a target of Republican scrutiny.

==== Oil, gas extraction and transportation ====
On January 21, 2021, the Biden administration issued a 60-day ban on oil and gas leases and permits on federal land and waters. On January 27, 2021, Biden signed a number of executive orders aimed at combating climate change, one of them setting climate change as a key consideration for U.S. national security and foreign policy. In an attempt to encourage U.S. membership to the Kigali Amendment, an international agreement aimed to reduce the production of hydrofluorocarbons, Biden's executive order directed the U.S. Department of State to submit the Kigali Amendment to the Senate.

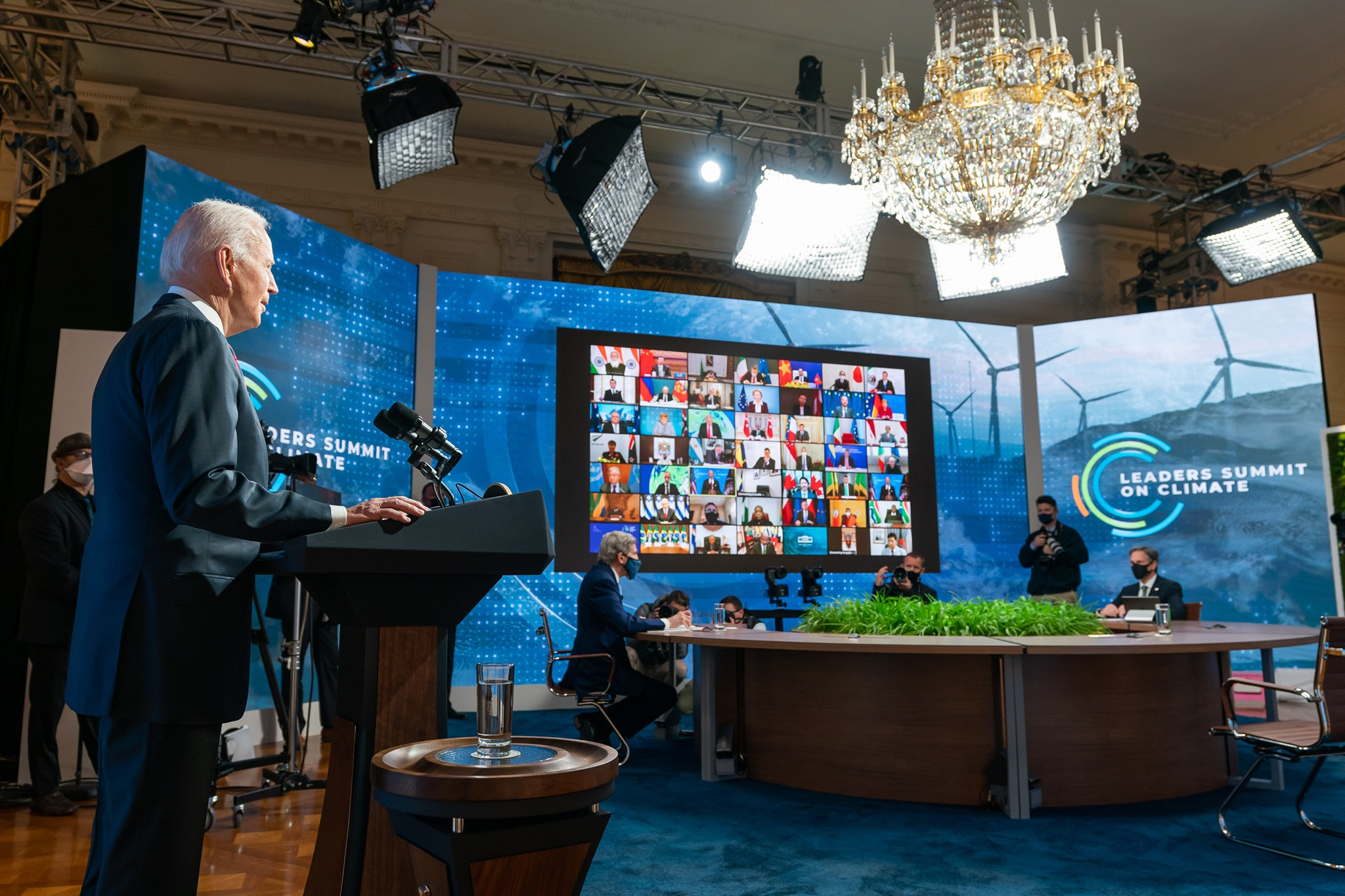
Biden at the Leaders Summit on Climate in April 2021, held virtually because of the COVID-19 pandemic

In March 2021, 21 Republican state attorneys general of 21 states sued the Biden administration for revoking the Keystone XL pipeline permit. The suit claims Biden's executive order exceeded his authority.

In May 2021, the EPA rolled back a Trump administration rule that prohibited the EPA from using certain studies. The previous rule, which made it more difficult to use major scientific studies to justify pollution reduction policies, had already been invalidated by a federal court.

On June 1, 2021, Secretary of the Interior Deb Haaland suspended all oil and gas drilling leases in Alaska's Arctic National Wildlife Refuge, pending further review of their environmental impacts.

In January 2021, Biden had issued a 60-day ban on oil and gas leases and permits on federal land and waters. A group of Republican state attorneys general successfully obtained a decision in federal court to lift the moratorium. The Biden administration appealed the decision but agreed to continue with the sales, and in September 2021 held the largest federal gas and oil lease auction in U.S. history, selling leases to extract 1.7 million acres in the Gulf of Mexico. The areas that were purchased by oil companies can be expected to produce around 4.2 trillion cubic feet of natural gas and 1.12 billion barrels of oil over the next 50 years. The administration has also proposed another round of gas and oil lease sales in 2022, in Colorado, Montana, Wyoming, and other western states.

The Biden administration supported the Line 3 pipeline, which transports oil from Canada's oil sands region.

In November 2021, a closely watched Interior Department report on federal oil and gas lease policy, ordered by Biden, was completed. The report recommended increasing the 12.5% federal royalty rate for oil and gas drilling, which had not been raised by a century, and was significantly lower than rates charged for leasing on state and private land. The report also recommended an increase in the bond rates that drilling companies are required to pay for future cleanup efforts before beginning extraction at new sites, and recommended that leases be focused on sites with "moderate to high potential" for production in proximity to existing fossil-fuel infrastructure. The report stopped short of banning the leasing program, which generates billions of dollars for the federal government, but reformed its terms to be less favorable for industry; environmental groups praised the reforms, but also said they were insufficient to address the U.S. contribution to the climate crisis.

In 2021, the Biden administration proposed a 20-year ban on oil and gas drilling around Chaco Culture National Historical Park, a site in northwestern New Mexico that contain important Ancestral Puebloan sites.

==== Environmental science ====
In May 2021, the EPA rolled back a Trump administration rule that prohibited the EPA from using certain studies. The previous rule, which made it more difficult to use major scientific studies to justify pollution reduction policies, had already been invalidated by a federal court.

==== Renewable energy ====
The Biden administration set a goal of achieving 30 gigawatts of offshore wind energy generated in the U.S. by 2030 (sufficient to provide electricity to about 10 million homes). In 2021, the Biden administration approved the South Fork Wind project, a major (130 MW, 12-turbine) commercial offshore wind power project located southeast of Rhode Island's Block Island and east of New York's Montauk Point, the wind farm is projected to provide electricity to proved 70,000 Long Island homes. The project is the country's second large-scale offshore wind project (after a similar wind-power development in Massachusetts).

==== Nature conservation ====
The U.S. is part of the 30 by 30 initiative which aims to preserve 30% of the global land and sea territory by 2030. For the U.S. to accomplish its part, Biden launched a campaign called "America the Beautiful". The campaign seeks to work in cooperation with indigenous people and farmers, as well as better serve disadvantaged communities.

In November 2021, Biden promised to end and reverse deforestation and land degradation by 2030, joining more than 100 other global leaders in the COP26 climate summit's first major agreement.

According to a report from the Center for American Progress during the first 3 years of his presidency Biden broke several records in conservation, which is "a proven defense against the changing climate". In 2023 alone he turned 12.5 million acres into protected areas and made 200 agreements with indigenous people about co-management of the protected areas. He advanced a proposal to ban logging in old growth forests from 2025 which is also important for the climate.

=== Electoral and ethical reform ===
In response to what Biden describes as the growing influence of special interests and gerrymandering in elections, he has pledged to seek electoral and government ethics reforms. Biden supported the For the People Act and the John Lewis Voting Rights Act. In January 2022, he endorsed a change to senate filibuster rules after they both failed to invoke cloture. However, the rules change failed when two Democratic senators joined Senate Republicans in opposing it.

Known for his generally bipartisan tone, Biden avoided directly referring to his predecessor during his first year in office. Beginning in 2022, Biden condemned Trump and Trumpism in stronger terms; he likened the "MAGA philosophy" to "semi-fascism" and, in a 2022 speech outside Independence Hall in Philadelphia, said the "extreme ideology" of Trump, and a Republican Party dominated by him, "threatens the very foundation of our republic." Biden specifically condemned Trump and "MAGA Republicans" for promoting authoritarian leaders, using violent rhetoric, refusing to disavow political violence, and refusing to acknowledge election losses. Biden suggested that the 2022 United States elections could be illegitimate if federal laws are not passed to combat enacted voter-suppression legislation from state legislatures.

After the attempts to overturn the 2020 United States presidential election, Biden called for reforms to the 1887 Electoral Count Act to clarify the roles of Congress and the vice president in certifying electoral votes. The Electoral Count Reform and Presidential Transition Improvement Act of 2022 raised the threshold for objections to electoral votes, clarified that the vice president cannot decertify electoral votes, and modified the process for which electors are certified. It was included as part of the 2023 Consolidated Appropriations Act.

=== Housing ===
Due to ongoing decreases in housing affordability exacerbated by the pandemic, inflation, and snarls in the global supply chain, Biden launched the Housing Supply Action Plan on May 16, 2022, to increase housing supply and construction through executive initiatives, administrative deregulation and funding from the Infrastructure Investment and Jobs Act. Due to the statutory limits upon federal intervention in housing policy, the plan relied heavily upon partnerships with willing municipal governments and the private sector to reform zoning and permitting laws and secure construction supply, issuing financial incentives to municipal governments for cooperation with the plan, issuing financial support to renters, landlords and first-time homeowners, and disincentivizing large institutional investors from acquiring government-owned or funded home properties. Biden also called upon Congress to pass an Unlocking Possibilities Program to allow HUD to issue grants to states and localities to help reform permitting for affordable housing, as well as further mortgage assistance for first-time homebuyers.

Through the Inflation Reduction Act, the Biden administration secured over $25 billion to invest in a variety of programs and tax credits that incentivize renovations and energy efficiency in housing through five federal agencies (HUD, IRS, DOE, DOT, EPA).

=== Immigration ===
Presidential Proclamation 10141 – Ending Discriminatory Bans on Entry to the United States

On January 20, 2021, the day Biden was inaugurated, he halted the construction of the U.S.–Mexico barrier and ended a related national emergency declared by Trump in February 2018. Biden issued a proclamation that ended the Trump travel ban imposed on predominantly Muslim countries in January 2017. Biden also reaffirmed protections to recipients of Deferred Action for Childhood Arrivals (DACA). The same day, Biden sent a memorandum to the U.S. Department of State reinstating Deferred Enforced Departure for Liberians.

On January 20, Biden proposed the U.S. Citizenship Act of 2021 which would enact broad changes to the immigration system. It would provide an eight-year potential pathway for citizenship to eleven million immigrants living in the U.S. without a permanent legal status. The bill would also make it easier for certain foreign workers to stay in the U.S. In addition, it would deliver record budget allocations for the Department of Homeland Security to secure the border and $4 billion to El Salvador, Guatemala and Honduras to combat the root causes of their emigration. If passed, it would also replace the word "alien" with "noncitizen" in U.S. immigration law. Senate Majority Whip Dick Durbin called the bill "aspirational" and it was widely expected not to pass both houses of Congress without significant revision.

Also on January 20, 2021, the Biden administration issued a moratorium on deportations from the U.S. Department of Homeland Security (DHS) for the first 100 days of his presidency. On January 22, Texas Attorney General Ken Paxton sued the Biden administration for violating Biden's written pledge to cooperatively work with the state of Texas. A federal judge in Texas subsequently issued a temporary restraining order barring the Biden administration from enforcing its moratorium, citing the lack of "any concrete, reasonable justification for a 100-day pause on deportations."

On January 22, 2021, Biden had a call with Mexican president Andrés Manuel López Obrador. On the call, Biden and López Obrador spoke about immigration, where Biden spoke of reducing immigration from Mexico to the U.S. by targeting what Biden deemed as root causes. According to an Associated Press report, López Obrador noted that Biden pledged $4 billion to "help development in Honduras, El Salvador and Guatemala — nations whose hardships have spawned tides of migration through Mexico toward the United States."

According to a 2021 Politico report, Republicans expected prior to Biden taking office that there would be a border surge at the start of 2021 (due to seasonal patterns and regional crises) and coordinated to make it a central issue in the lead-up to the 2022 mid-term elections. The number of migrants arriving in the U.S. from Central America had been rising since April 2020 due to ongoing violence, natural disasters, food insecurity, and poverty in the region. In February 2021, the U.S. Border Patrol reported a 61% increase in encounters with unaccompanied children from the month before, the largest one-month percentage increase in encounters with unaccompanied children since U.S. Customs and Border Protection began recording data in 2010.

Biden instructed the U.S. Immigration and Customs Enforcement (ICE) to focus on violent offenders of immigration laws rather than all offenders of immigration laws.

In February 2021, it was reported that DHS agents who had been empowered by Trump to enact his anti-immigration policies were resisting and defying Biden's immigration policies. The union representing ICE agents signaled that its agents would not accept reversals of Trump policies.

In March 2021, the Biden administration granted temporary protected status to Venezuelans fleeing the country amidst the ongoing political and economic crisis.

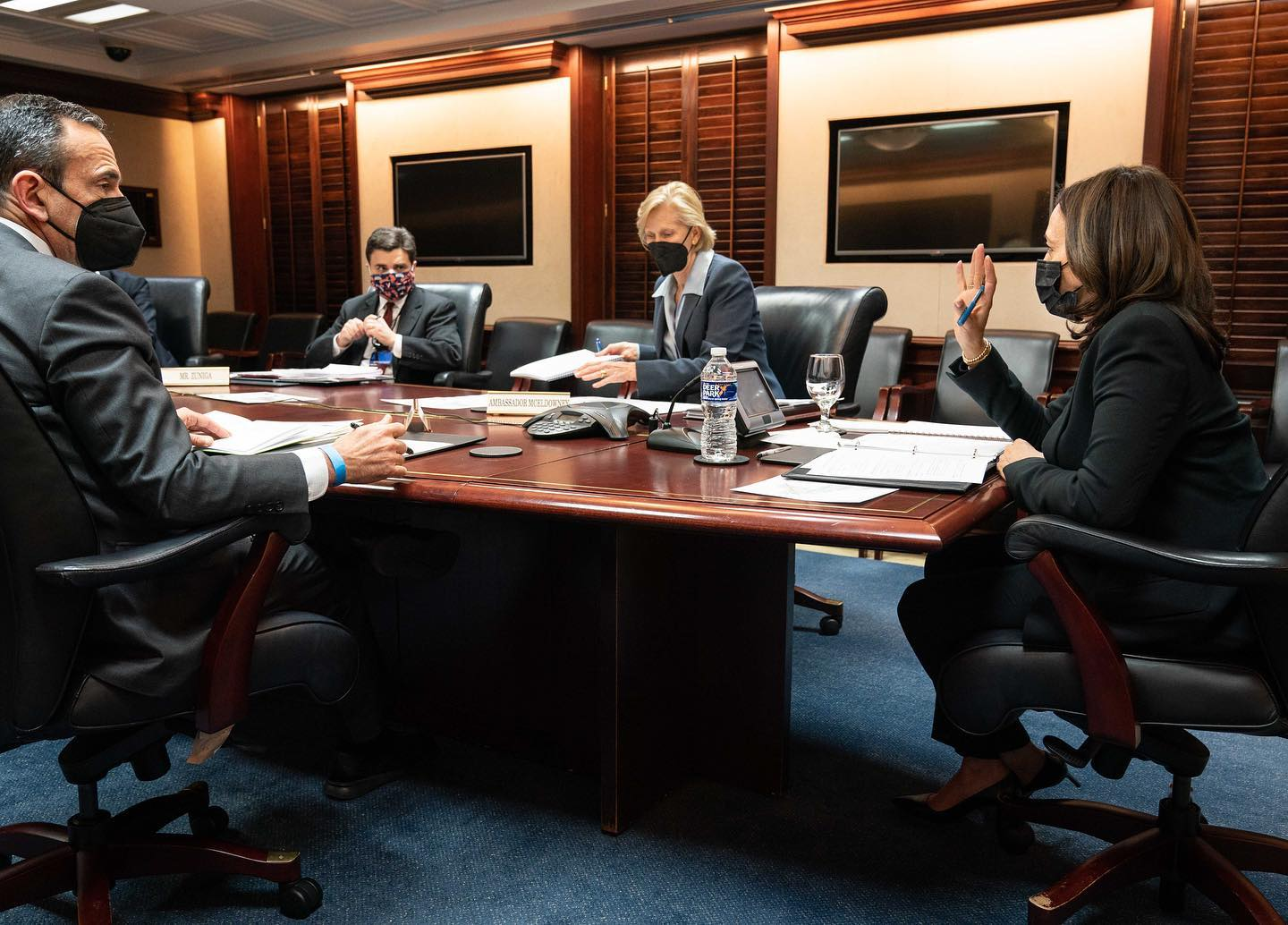
Vice President Kamala Harris meets with State Department Special Envoy for the Northern Triangle, Ricardo Zúñiga, and other officials on the surge of migrants from Central America, March 2021.

On March 24, 2021, Biden tasked Vice President Harris to reduce the number of unaccompanied minors and adult asylum seekers. She is also tasked with leading the negotiations with Mexico, Honduras, Guatemala, and El Salvador. The number of migrant families and unaccompanied children entering the U.S. from across the Southwest border steeply declined in August, September, and October 2021.

On June 1, 2021, the DHS officially terminated the Trump-era "Remain in Mexico" policy, which mandated that all asylum seekers from Central America were to wait in Mexico pending their court cases; however, a health order from March 2020 allowed the border authorities to send migrants back for the duration of the COVID-19 pandemic have remained in place. However, on August 14, 2021, a federal judge in Texas ordered the Biden administration to reimplement the policy; the Supreme Court placed a pause on the ruling to give the administration time for arguments. On August 24, 2021, the Supreme Court ruled that the Biden administration must comply with the lower court's ruling to reinstate the policy.

In fiscal year 2022, over one million immigrants (most of whom entered through family reunification) were granted legal residence, up from 707,000 in 2020. Up until 2022 during Biden's presidency, the number of unauthorized immigrants in the United States steadily rose.

On October 5, 2023, Biden's administration said it will add sections to a border wall to stave off record migrant crossings from Mexico, carrying forward a signature policy of former president Donald Trump. One of Biden's first actions after taking office in January 2021 was to issue a proclamation pledging that "no more American taxpayer dollars be diverted to construct a border wall" as well as a review of all resources that had already been committed. The administration said Thursday's action did not deviate from Biden's proclamation because money that was allocated during Trump's term in 2019 had to be spent now. Former president Trump was quick to claim victory and demand an apology: "As I have stated often, over thousands of years, there are only two things that have consistently worked, wheels, and walls!" Trump wrote on social media. "Will Joe Biden apologize to me and America for taking so long to get moving...". Mexico's President Andres Manuel Lopez Obrador called the move "a step backwards."

On October 31, 2023, Homeland Security Secretary Alejandro Mayorkas testified before the Senate Homeland Security Committee that more than 600,000 people illegally made their way into the United States without being apprehended by border agents during the 2023 fiscal year.

President Biden pledged to welcome 125,000 refugees in 2024. The Biden administration considered accepting Palestinian refugees from the Gaza Strip.

On March 29, 2024, in response to a class-action lawsuit filed by lawyers representing detained migrant children, the Biden administration argued in front of a federal court that it had no responsibility to feed and house migrant children that were waiting in Border Patrol camps along the U.S.-Mexico border. This argument was rejected by Judge Dolly M. Gee, who ordered the administration to "expeditiously" house all detained migrant children.

On June 4, 2024, President Biden issued a new executive order granting immigration officials the authority to deport certain asylum seekers without processing their claims. This measure targets migrants who enter the United States "without permission and against the law," making it easier for authorities to deport them. Under the new order, if migrants express fear of returning to their home countries, they may be given an interview with an asylum officer. However, agents are no longer required to ask migrants if they have such fears. As part of the new action, the Biden administration announced the closure of the South Texas Family Residential Center, the largest immigrant detention center in the United States. The primary reason cited for this decision was the high cost of operating the facility.

==== 2024 bipartisan border bill ====
Following months of negotiations, on February 4, 2024, a bipartisan group of senators released a 370-page bill intended to sharply reduce incentives for migrants to attempt border crossings. The bill included a "border emergency" provision that would automatically require the border to be closed if border encounters reached an average of 5,000 per day over several days. Trump, Speaker Mike Johnson, and other Republicans falsely claimed the bill allowed 5,000 illegal border crossings per day. In reality, the bill would have ended the practice of "catch and release" that allows migrants entry into the country while they await immigration hearings; instead, migrants would have been detained pending hearings. The plan included a tighter asylum application and approval process with speedy removal of migrants who do not qualify, the hiring of thousands more border patrol and asylum officers and an increase in detention capacity. The bill also provided for thousands of work visas for migrant spouses of U.S. citizens awaiting immigrant visas, and 250,000 new visas over five years for people seeking to work in the U.S. or join family members. It aimed to provide a pathway to citizenship for "Documented Dreamers", children who accompanied their parents on a work visa and who could lose their place in line for a green card at age 21.

President Biden supported the bill, while Speaker Johnson said days before its release that it would be "dead on arrival" in the Republican-controlled House. Shortly after the proposal was announced, House majority leader Steve Scalise declared it would not be brought before the House for a vote. One negotiator, independent Arizona Senator Kyrsten Sinema, asserted the border would have been closed every day so far in early January 2024 if the bill had been law; Biden promised in January that he would immediately close the border if the bill was enacted. Lead Republican negotiator James Lankford of Oklahoma, among the most conservative Republican Senators, attempted to defend the bill throughout the weeks leading to the vote. Trump, the leading Republican candidate for president in 2024, publicly and privately pressured Republicans during the Senate negotiations to oppose the proposal. The National Border Patrol Council, a labor union representing some 18,000 border patrol officers, quickly endorsed the Senate bill. The union had endorsed Trump in 2020 and had been critical of Biden's policies.

Senate Republicans swiftly turned against the bill upon its release, after Trump openly said he did not want Joe Biden to score a political win with the legislation. On February 7, 2024, Senate Republicans blocked the proposal in a floor vote. Lankford said on the floor before the vote that a "popular commentator" had told him a month earlier, "'If you try to move a bill that solves the border crisis during this presidential year, I will do whatever I can to destroy you, because I do not want you to solve this during the presidential election.'" Two days before the vote, Trump told a radio host, "This is a very bad bill for his career." Trump said at a rally days later, "We crushed crooked Joe Biden's disastrous open borders bill," while Biden said, "Every day between now and November, the American people are going to know that the only reason the border is not secure is Donald Trump and his MAGA Republican friends."

=== Separation of church and state ===
Biden, a practicing Catholic, has taken a public position of dissent against the Church's position opposing free-choice in the abortion issue. This has raised the question of whether his public office might allow him to influence the outcomes of current debates with the Church concerning abortion. The Vatican has taken a mediating position concerning Biden's dissent by allowing him to take Communion in Rome while visiting the Pope.

=== Social issues ===
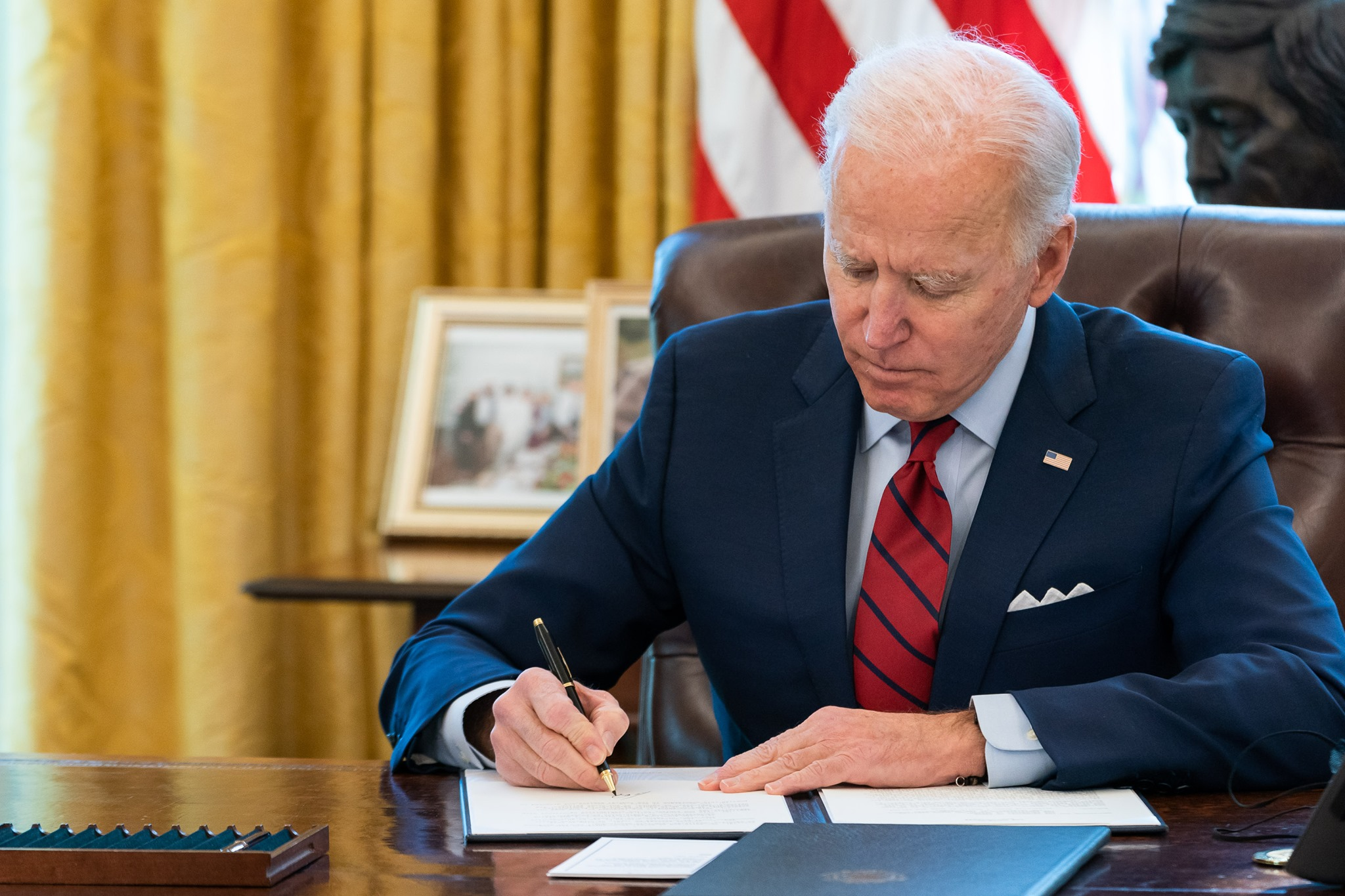
President Biden signs executive orders expanding the Affordable Care Act and revoking Trump administration health policies, January 2021.

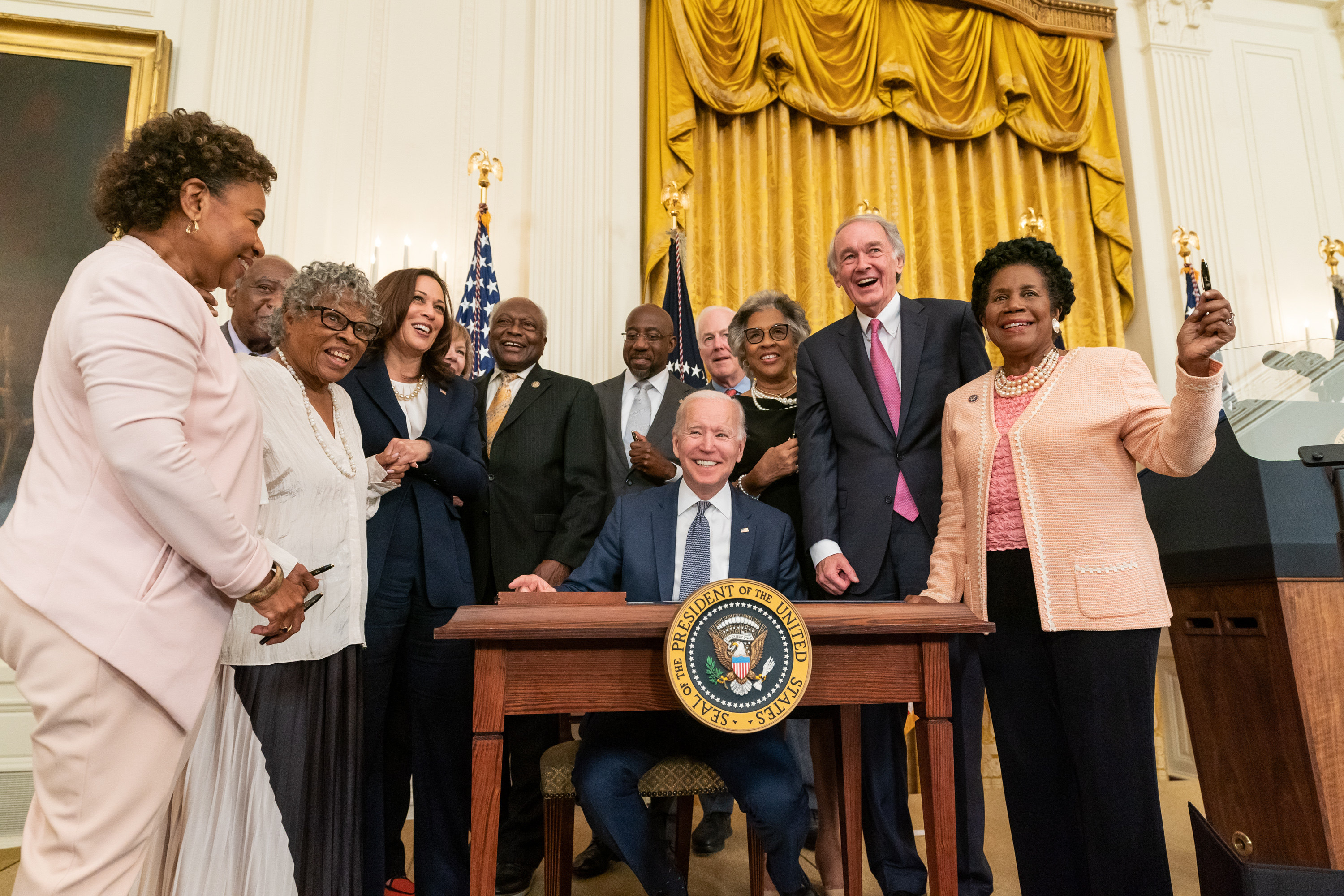
President Biden signed the Juneteenth National Independence Day Act into law, June 17, 2021.

During his early days in office, Biden focused on "advancing equity, civil rights, racial justice and equal opportunity." According to The New York Times, Biden's early actions in office focused on racial equality more than any president since Lyndon B. Johnson, who passed the Civil Rights Act of 1964. On January 25, 2021, Biden signed an executive order that lifted the ban on transgender military service members. This reversed a memorandum imposed by Trump.

The Biden administration sought to put Harriet Tubman on the twenty-dollar bill. This effort followed that of the Obama administration, which was blocked by Steven Mnuchin. Press secretary Psaki said it was important that U.S. money and notes reflect the "history and diversity" of the country and that putting Tubman on the twenty-dollar bill would do so.

On January 20, 2021, the Biden administration issued an Executive Order entitled Advancing Racial Equity and Support for Underserved Communities Through the Federal Government increasing the federal government's anti-bias enforcement against government contractors. The intent is heightened investigations and audits by the Department of Justice as well as more detailed follow-up inquiries with government contractors, with an emphasis on combatting pay discrimination. Also in January, Biden directed the U.S. Department of Justice to reduce their usage of private prisons and ordered the attorney general to not renew contracts with private prisons, citing the need to "reduce profit-based incentives" for the incarceration of racial minorities.

Three days after the Atlanta spa shootings that killed 8 people, including 6 Asian women, Biden and Vice President Harris travelled to Atlanta. They spoke to Asian American and Pacific Islander advocates and leaders and condemned sexism, and racism against Asian Americans.

Biden made Juneteenth (June 19) a federal holiday in 2021, celebrating the end of slavery in the U.S. In March 2022, Biden signed the Emmett Till Antilynching Act into law. With the enactment of that legislation, lynching was made a federal hate crime for the first time in American history.

In October 2022, Biden pardoned all past federal marijuana possession charges and announced an inquiry into whether cannabis should be removed from Schedule I of the Controlled Substances Act. In December 2022, Biden signed the Medical Marijuana and Cannabidiol Research Expansion Act which was the first standalone cannabis-related bill ever passed by the United States Congress.

In January 2025, Biden declared the lapsed Equal Rights Amendment ratified as the "28th Amendment" to the constitution. However, the declaration has no formal effect and the National Archives has said they do not intend to certify the amendment as part of the constitution, citing "established legal, judicial, and procedural decisions."

==== LGBT rights ====
The United States Department of Agriculture unveiled efforts in 2022 to prevent anti-LGBT discrimination in food programs, including school lunch programs, resulting in 20 lawsuits from 20 Republican attorneys general.

In December 2022, Biden signed the Respect for Marriage Act, which repealed the Defense of Marriage Act (DOMA), required states to recognize other states' marriage certificates for LGBT Americans, and ensured some religious liberties. The bill came from a push from Democrats to codify same-sex marriage after the Dobbs decision, particularly Clarence Thomas's push to reconsider other precedents.

In January 2023, the Biden administration released an "evidence agenda" for LGBTQI+ Americans to learn about "their experiences engaging with federal agencies and the disparities they face in their daily lives," as well as documenting how many LGBT people live in the United States.

==== Abortion ====
In December 2021, the Biden administration ended a long-standing restriction on sales of abortion pills through the mail. This decision came amidst legal cases and Supreme Court decisions that jeopardized abortion access in the United States.

After the U.S. Supreme Court overturned Roe v. Wade and Planned Parenthood v. Casey on June 24, 2022, in Dobbs v. Jackson Women's Health Organization, Biden addressed the nation in the Cross Hall of the White House. He mentioned that "it's a sad day ... for the country" and "with Roe gone, ... The health and life of women in this nation are now at risk." In addition, he attacked the Court saying "With this decision, the conservative majority of the Supreme Court shows how extreme it is" and "They have made the United States an outlier among developed nations in the world." Regarding action, Biden stated that his administration will defend the right of women to seek an abortion in another state where abortion is legal and help protect a woman's access to contraception and abortion pills approved by the FDA. He also called on Congress to codify Roe v. Wade, saying "No executive action ... can do that.". But stated that if Congress did not have the votes to codify, that the voters would have to take action by "elect[ing] more senators and representatives who will codify a woman's right to choose into federal law."

The Biden administration rejected the call from progressives to allow abortions on federal land, with White House press secretary Karine Jean-Pierre saying, "in states where abortion is now illegal, women and providers who are not federal employees, as you look at the federal land, could be potentially – be prosecuted."

During a press conference at the 2022 Madrid NATO Summit, Biden expressed support for providing an exception to the filibuster to codify Roe v. Wade.

==== Criminal justice and crime rates ====
The Biden administration rescinded a Trump administration policy that curtailed the use of consent decrees that had been used by previous administrations in their investigations of misconduct in police departments.

Biden proposed in his fiscal 2022 budget to more than double funding for the Community Oriented Policing Services (COPS) Hiring Program, which helps state and local governments to hire law enforcement officers.

Despite perceptions, notably by Republicans and conservative media, of a "crime crisis" of soaring violent crime under Biden, FBI data indicated the violent crime rate had declined significantly during the president's first two years in office, after a spike in 2020 during the COVID pandemic. By 2022, the violent crime rate was near a 50-year low, and preliminary data released in early 2024 indicated continuing declines in 2023.

As of July 1, 2024, violent crime was down and homicides were on pace to drop to 2015 levels by the end of the year.

==== Pardons and commutations ====
Biden issued more individual pardons and commutations than any other president. On October 6, 2022, he pardoned all Americans convicted of "small" amounts of cannabis possession under federal law. In December 2023, he pardoned Americans for cannabis use or possession on federal lands regardless of whether they had been charged or prosecuted. In December 2024, in the largest single-day clemency act in history, Biden granted clemency to about 1,500 nonviolent felons in home confinement who had previously been released from prison. The act generated controversy, as it included felons such as Michael Conahan, a judge involved in the kids for cash kickback scandal, and Rita Crundwell, a comptroller responsible for the single largest municipal fraud in U.S. history. Also in December 2024, Biden commuted the sentences of 37 of the 40 individuals on federal death row to life imprisonment without the possibility of parole.

On December 1, 2024, Biden issued a "full and unconditional" pardon to his son, Hunter Biden, that covered all federal offenses between 2014 and December 1, 2024. According to Reason magazine, the pardon's sweeping extent was "unprecedented" and was even more far-reaching than Richard Nixon's or other "controversial" pardons:

The Hunter pardon is far more comprehensive...in that it covered not just his convictions for drug-related activities and tax fraud, but any other criminal behavior since 2014—the year that Hunter joined the board of Ukrainian energy company Burisma. It has been alleged that Hunter's job was essentially to trade on the family name and sell his access to dad. This may not have been illegal, but it does mean that the pardon is clearly designed to offer preemptive protection not just to Hunter, but to Joe Biden himself. These features make the pardon unprecedented, though perfectly in line with the president's executive powers.

Hunter had been convicted on charges related to tax and gun offenses, after which Joe made numerous promises not to pardon him. He and his staff continued to say that Hunter would not be pardoned as late as November, although internal staff discussions affirmed that the option remained on the table even as Biden said otherwise. In a statement announcing the pardon, Biden said he believed his son was "selectively, and unfairly, prosecuted".

On his last day in office, Biden issued pardons for more of his family members and other high-profile figures. The pardons covered Biden's siblings and their spouses, including James Biden, who was interviewed as part of an impeachment probe into Biden. Others pardoned that day include former chairman of the Joint Chiefs of Staff Mark Milley, former National Institute of Allergy and Infectious Diseases director Anthony Fauci, and members and participants in the House Select Committee on the January 6 Attack, despite many of those pardoned not having been under criminal investigation. Biden justified the pardons by citing his concern about "baseless and politically motivated investigations" during Trump's second term. Biden added that the pardons were preemptive and should not be seen as implying their recipients' guilt. The pardons Biden granted to his family and other political figures had a sweeping scope similar to the one he granted Hunter, covering federal offenses the recipients committed or may have committed between 2014 and the day of the pardon.

==== Gun control ====
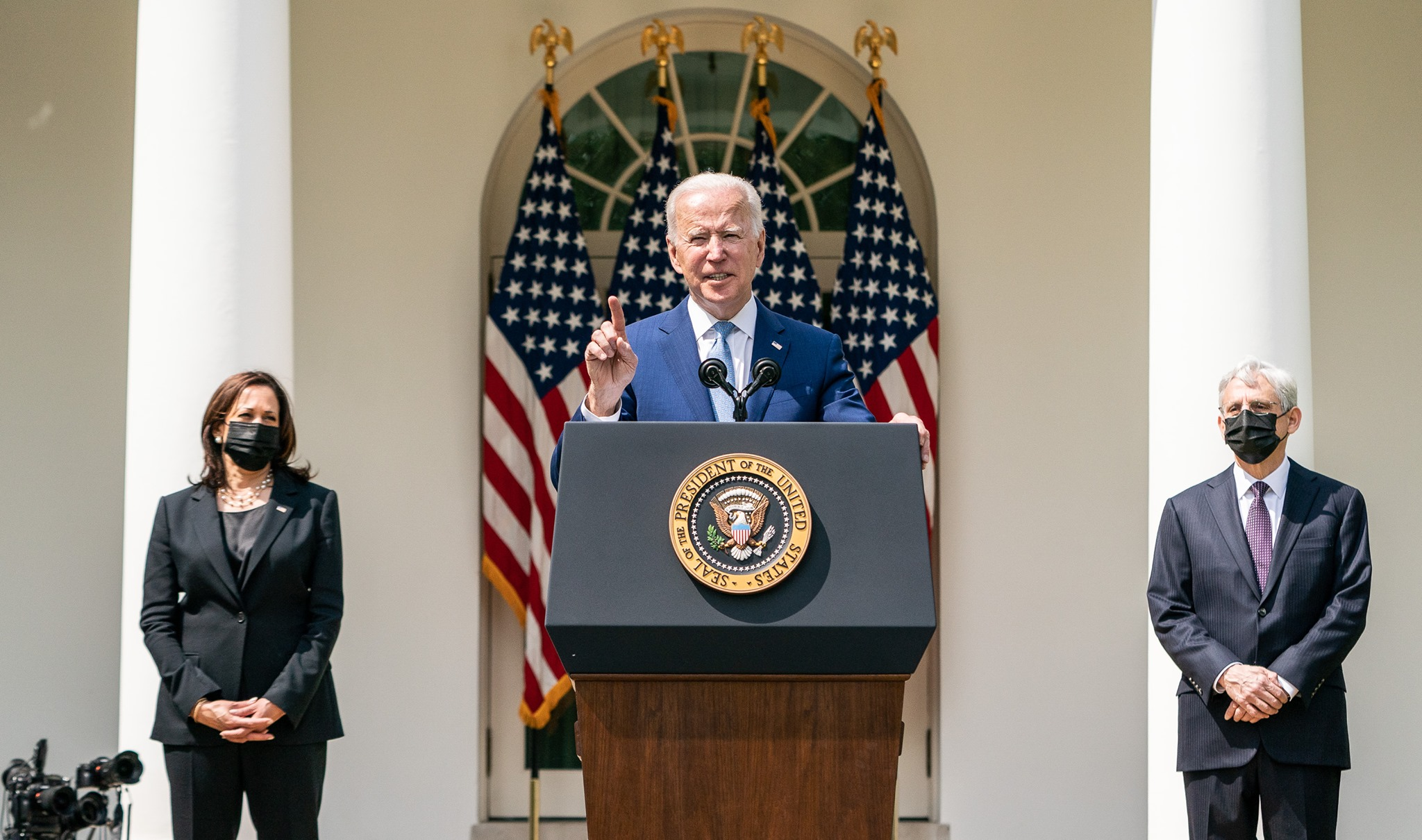
President Biden announces new executive measures on gun control with Vice President Kamala Harris and Attorney General Merrick Garland in the White House Rose Garden, April 8, 2021.

President Biden addresses the nation after the Robb Elementary School shooting.

In a national address in March 2021, after mass shootings in the Atlanta area and Boulder, Colorado, Biden advocated further gun regulations, such as a restored ban on assault weapons and a high-capacity magazine ban, as well as reinforcing preexisting background checks.

After the Robb Elementary School shooting on May 24, 2022, President Biden addressed the nation. The next week, he again called on Congress to pass an assault weapons and high-capacity magazine ban, as well as red flag laws and other legislation. As a result of the shooting, the Bipartisan Safer Communities Act was eventually passed by Congress and signed into law. It marked the first federal gun safety law to have been enacted in 30 years.

After the Colorado Springs nightclub shooting, Biden called again for an assault weapons ban.

=== Space policy ===
The Biden administration reversed the Trump administration's method of using the National Space Council to coordinate commercial, civil, and military space policies, instead using the National Security Council to issue national security memoranda instead of the Space Council's space policy directives. The Biden administration renewed the National Space Council, chaired by Vice President Harris, "to assist the president in generating national space policies, strategies, and synchronizing America's space activities." Harris held meetings with the leaders of five countries to discuss international cooperation on space issues.

The Biden administration continued the Artemis program to send people back to the Moon. The administration also emphasized the role of NASA in studying climate change.

Biden appointed Bill Nelson, an astronaut and former U.S. senator, to the post of NASA administrator. Nelson was confirmed unanimously by the Senate in April 2021.

In April 2021, as part of his first annual budget request, Biden proposed a $24.8 billion budget for NASA in 2022, a $1.5 billion increase on what Congress allocated to 2021. The proposal includes funding for the Artemis program for a new crewed Moon landing mission. The proposal also included a 12.5% increase for NASA's Earth Science Division, as well as a 22% increase for the National Oceanic and Atmospheric Administration, which operates a fleet of weather satellites; both measures aimed to use space tools to study and mitigate climate change.

On December 1, 2021, Biden announced his new framework for US space policy, the United States Space Priorities Framework, which explains Biden's approach for commercial, civil, and military space activity. There is a new emphasis on combating climate change and investing in STEM education.

=== Surveillance ===
In 2024, Biden reauthorized Section 702.

== Foreign affairs ==
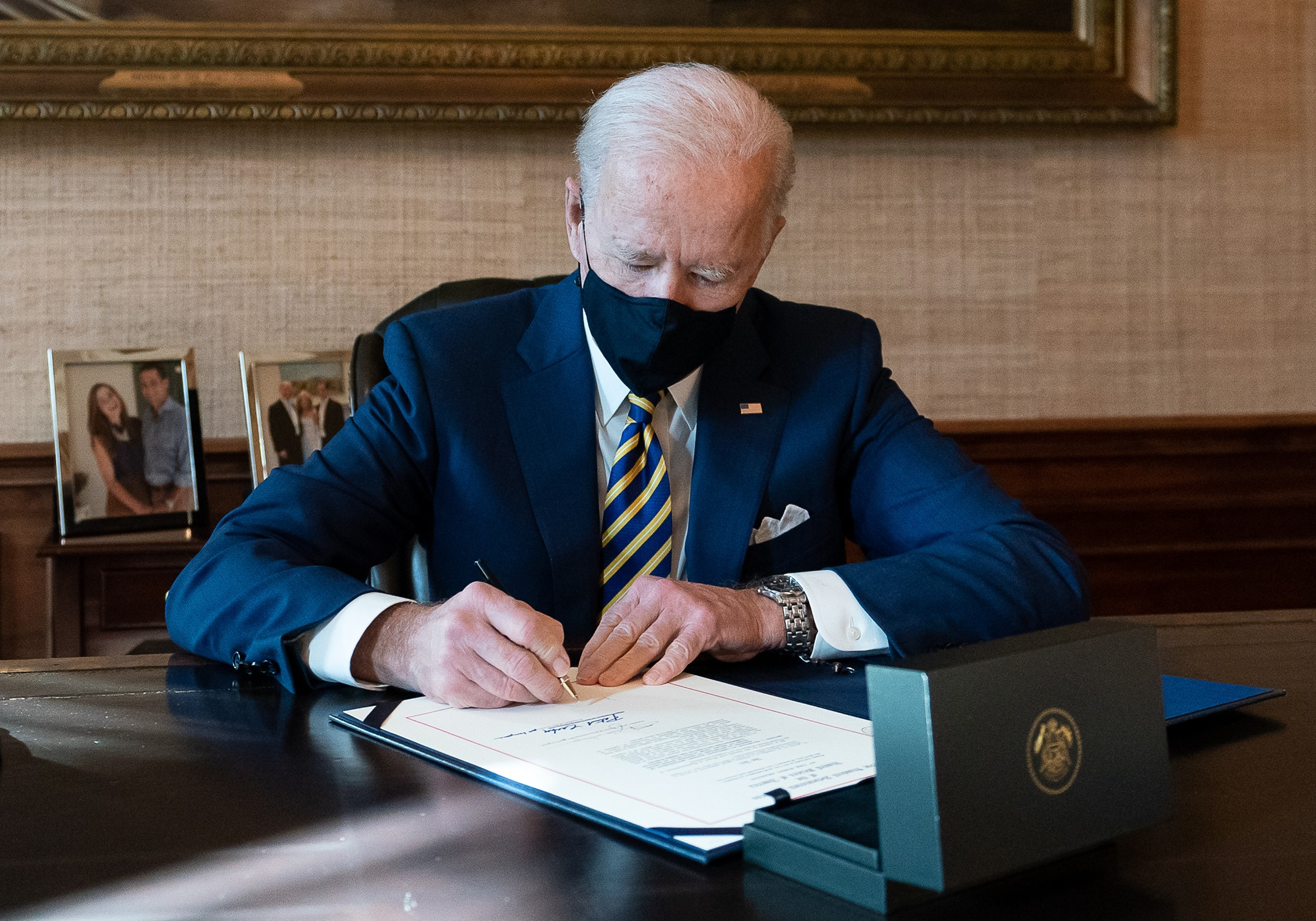
President Biden signs his first bill, H.R. 335.

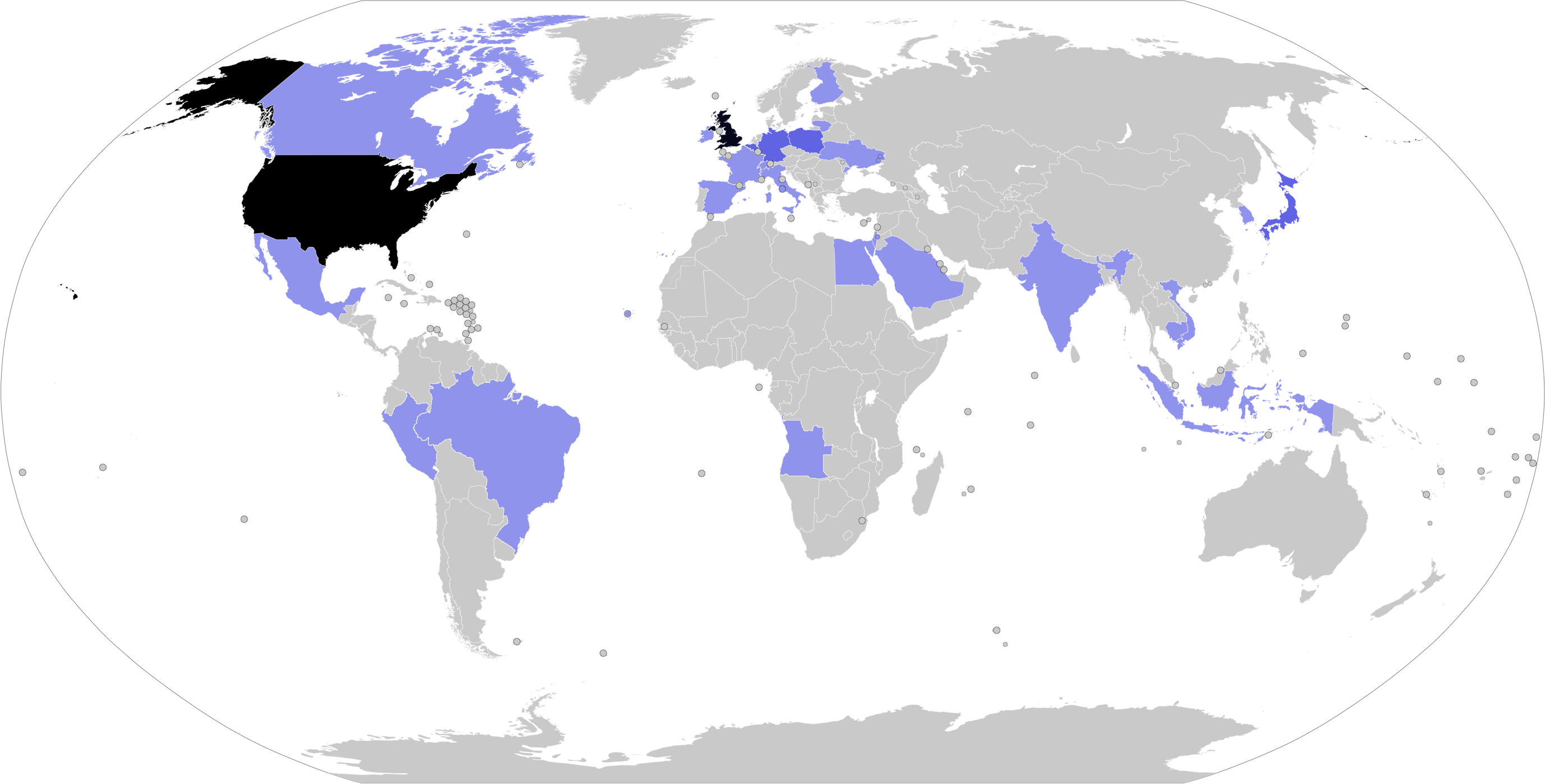
As of December 2024, Biden had made 21 international trips to 28 different countries during his presidency.

=== Defense ===
On January 22, 2021, Biden signed his first bill, H.R. 335 into law, providing a waiver to the law preventing appointment of a Secretary of Defense who had been on active duty in the armed forces within the past seven years; this was the third time such a waiver was granted by Congress. Retired army four-star general Lloyd Austin was confirmed by the Senate in a 93–2 vote that same day, making Austin the first African-American Defense Secretary.

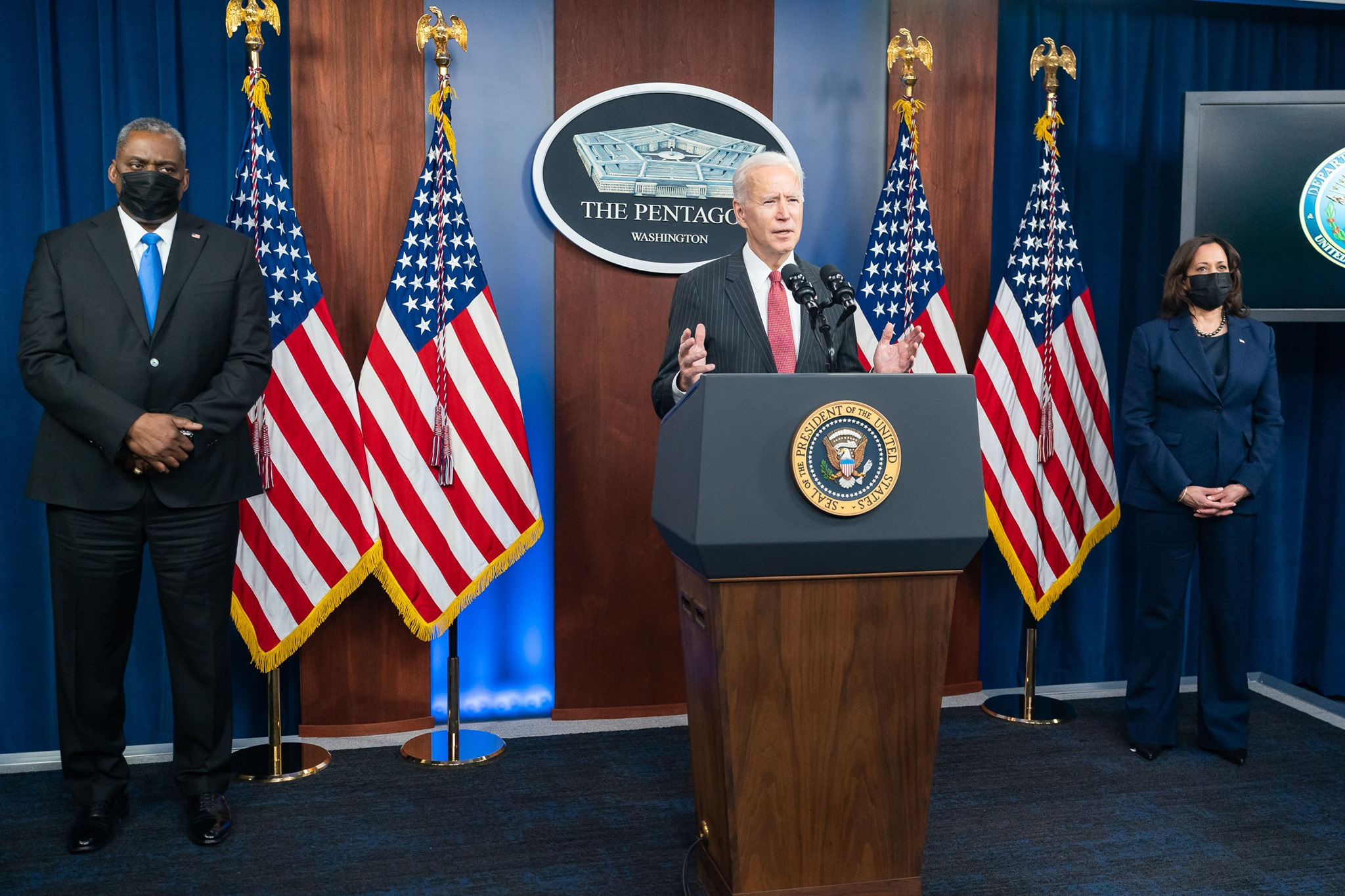
President Biden delivers remarks at The Pentagon, February 2021.

Austin said his number one priority was to assist COVID-19 relief efforts, pledging he would "quickly review the Department's contributions to COVID-19 relief efforts, ensuring that we're doing everything that we can to help distribute vaccines across the country and to vaccinate our troops and preserve readiness."

On February 10, 2021, Biden visited the Pentagon for the first time as president. In remarks to service members alongside Vice President Kamala Harris and Defense Secretary Lloyd Austin, Biden announced a U.S. Department of Defense-led China task force "to provide a baseline assessment of department policies, programs and processes in regard to the challenge China poses."

On June 18, 2021, the administration removed eight MIM-104 Patriot anti-missile batteries from Saudi Arabia, Jordan, Kuwait, and Iraq, removed the THAAD anti-missile defense system from Saudi Arabia, and announced that most jet squadrons and hundreds of American troops would be withdrawn from the region. The changes come in light of both de-escalating tensions with Iran and the administration changing its focus on countering China.

After taking office, Biden heavily restricted the use of armed drones and drone strikes. After Biden's first year in office, drone strikes had hit a 20-year low and were heavily limited by the administration.

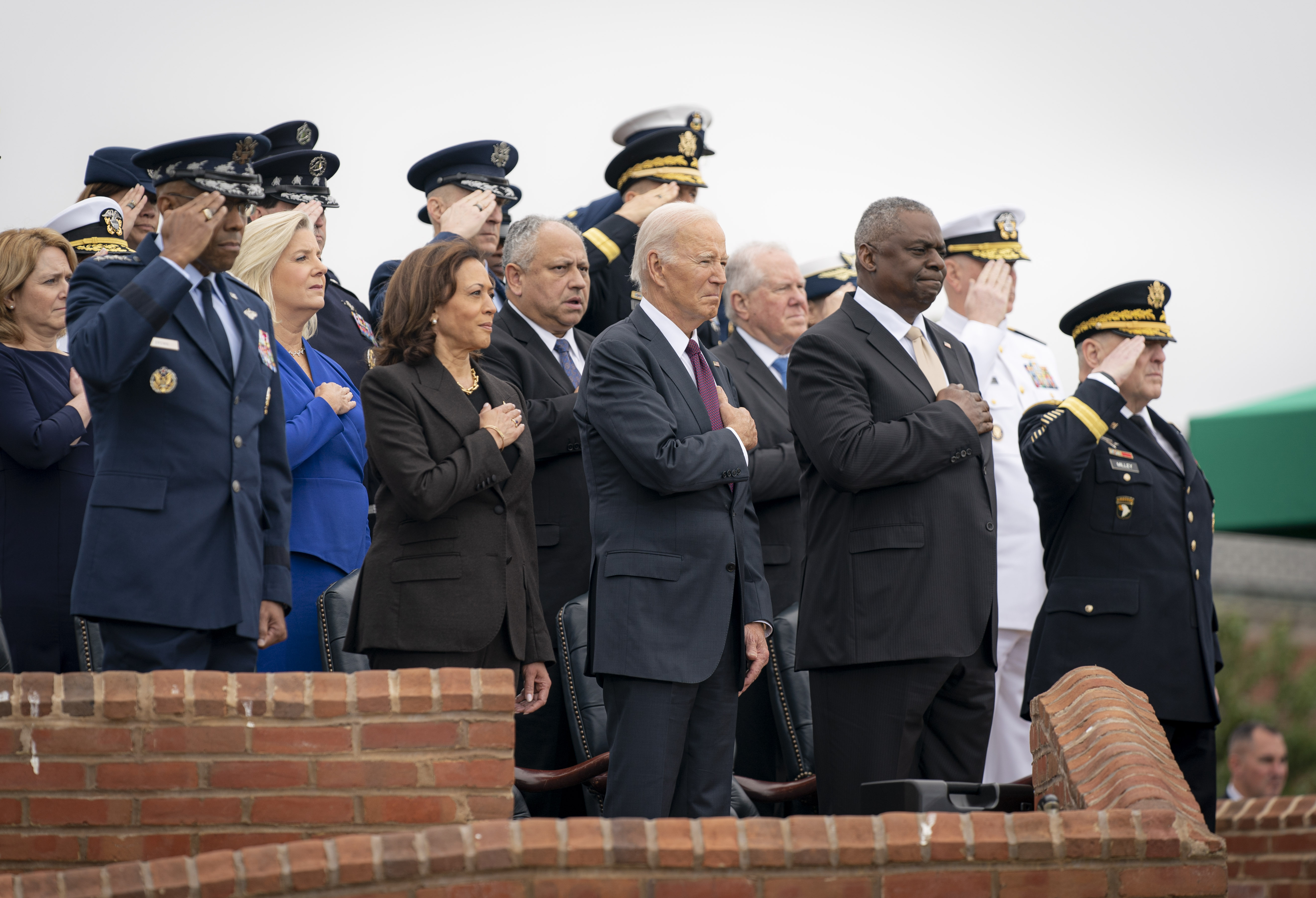
Biden and Vice President Kamala Harris at the welcoming ceremony for Chairman of the Joint Chiefs of Staff Charles Q. Brown Jr. (left) on September 29, 2023. Outgoing chairman General Mark Milley (right) and Secretary of Defense Lloyd Austin (center-right) are present.

In October 2023, President Biden asked Congress for nearly $106 billion in funding for Israel, Ukraine, countering China in the Indo-Pacific, and operations on the southern U.S. border. Biden signed a record $886 billion defense spending bill into law on December 22, 2023.

=== Indo-Pacific strategy ===
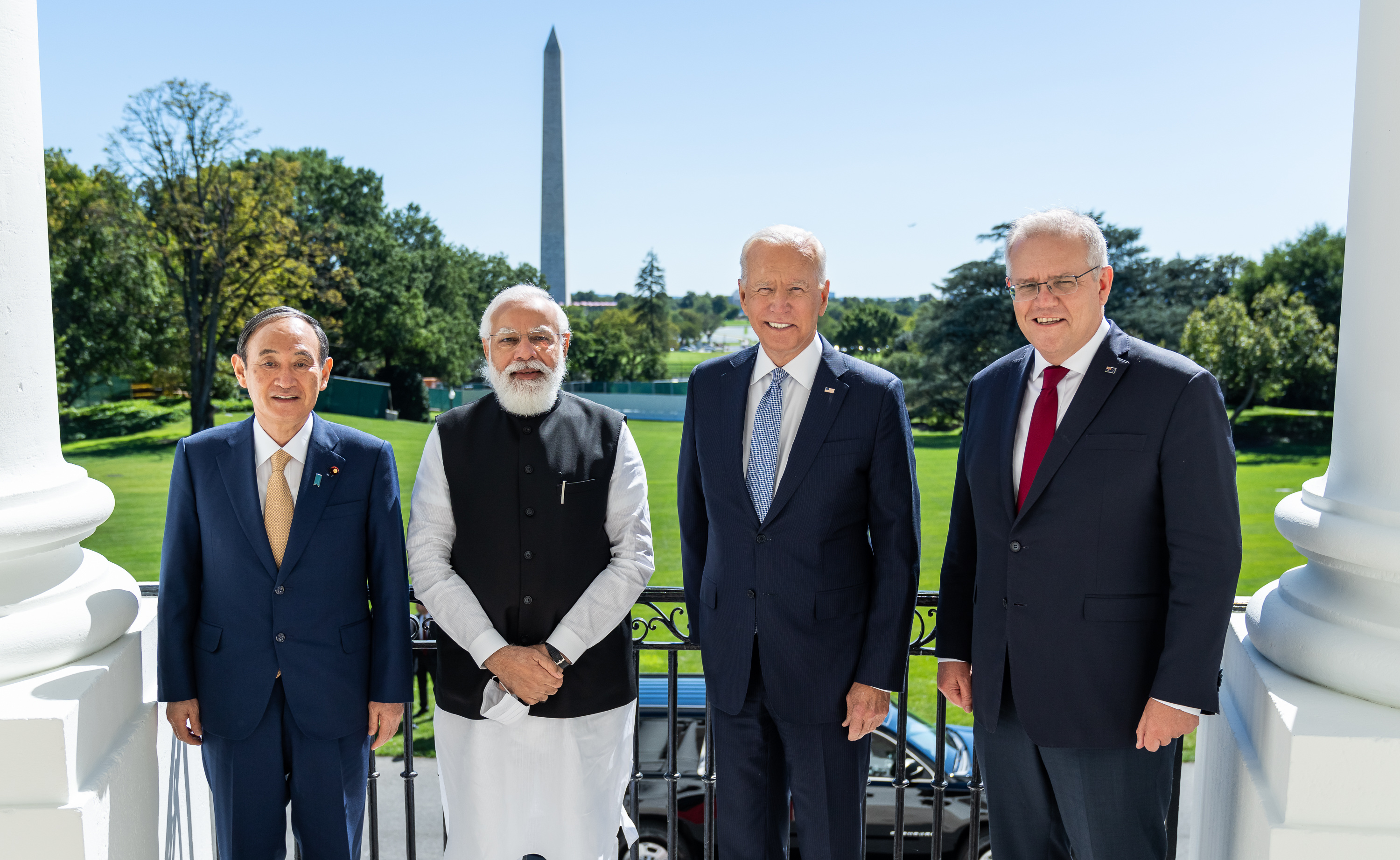
President Biden hosted the Quad meeting at the White House, September 24, 2021.

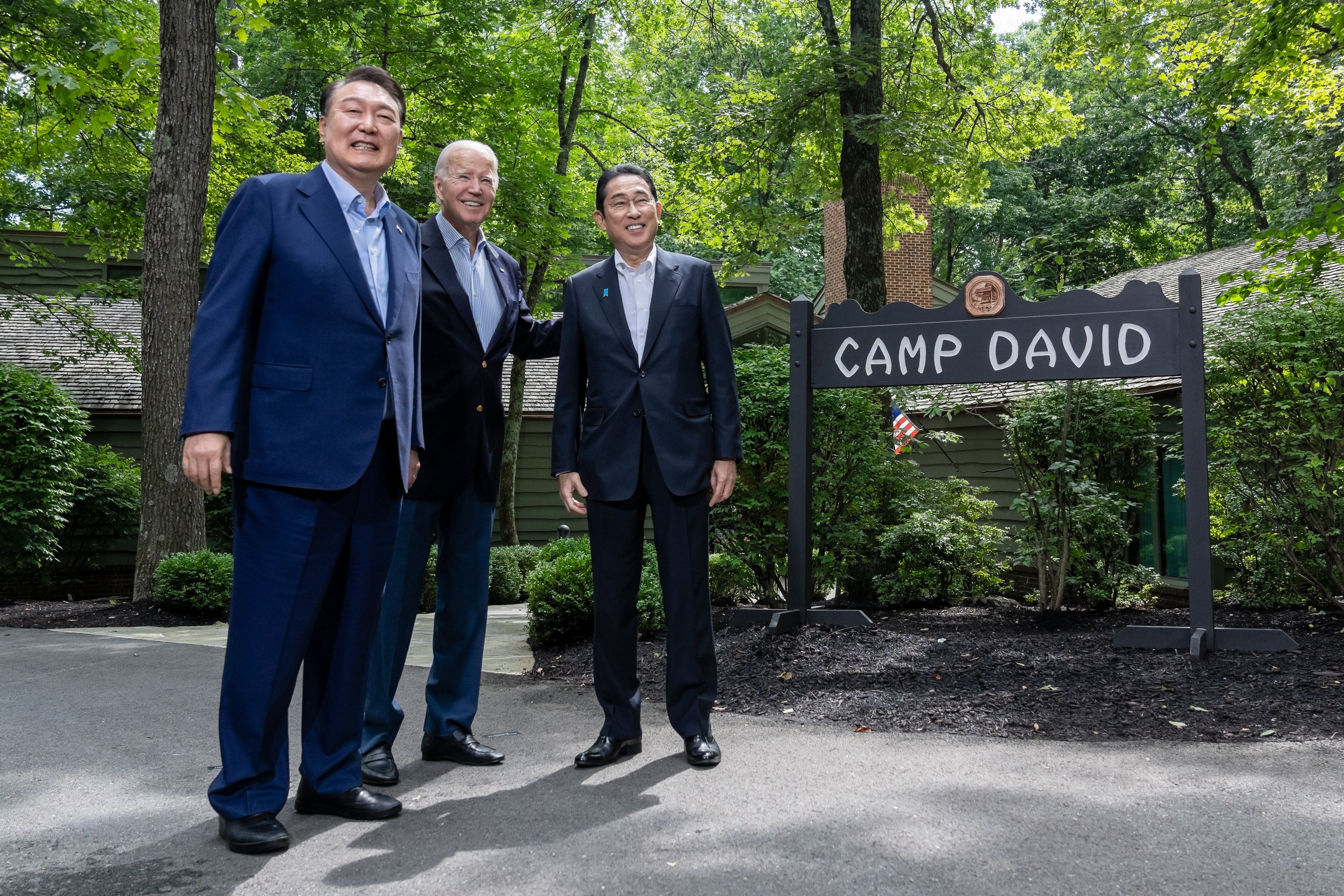
President Biden hosted the American–Japanese–Korean trilateral pact at Camp David, August 18, 2023.

In 2021, Biden held a virtual meeting with leaders of Japan, India and Australia, an alliance of countries known as the Quadrilateral Security Dialogue, or the Quad, that work together to address China's expansionism in the Indo-Pacific region. This was followed by high level meetings and sanctions on Chinese officials, and later hosting the first in-person Quad summit at the White House.

On May 23, 2022, Biden launched the Indo-Pacific Economic Framework for Prosperity (IPEF) with 12 regional partners to counter growing Chinese economic and political influence in the Indo-Pacific region, a move China described as a "closed and exclusive club". In November 2023, under pressure from Congressional Democrats, the Biden administration halted plans for the IPEF's trade component.

On August 18, 2023, Biden hosted Japan's Fumio Kishida and South Korea's Yoon Suk Yeol at Camp David, producing the Camp David Principles relating to joint military exercises, supply chain resilience, and united criticism of North Korea, Russia, and China.

=== China ===
Biden has said the U.S. needs to "get tough" on China and build "a united front of U.S. allies and partners to confront China's abusive behaviors and human rights violations." He described China as the "most serious competitor" that poses challenges on the "prosperity, security, and democratic values" of the U.S.

Biden nominated Antony Blinken to serve as Secretary of State who took office on January 26, 2021. During his nomination hearing, Blinken said that previous optimistic approaches to China were flawed, and that Biden's predecessor, Donald Trump, "was right in taking a tougher approach to China" but he "disagree[s] very much with the way [Trump] went about it in a number of areas." He endorsed former secretary of state Mike Pompeo's report that China is committing a genocide against Uyghur Muslims.

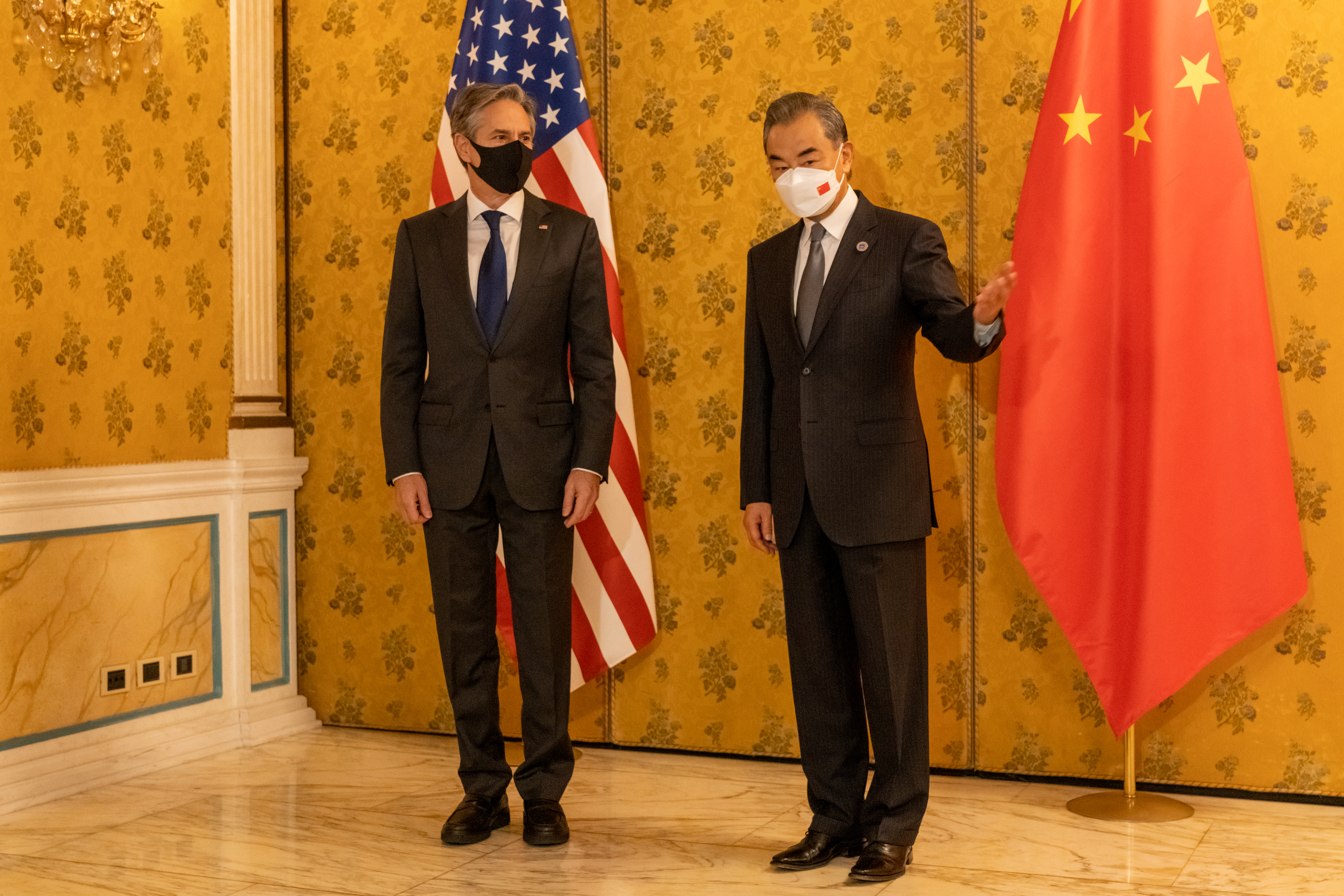
Secretary of State Antony Blinken meets with Chinese State Councillor and Foreign Minister Wang Yi on October 31, 2021.

In March 2021, Secretary of State Antony Blinken, National Security Advisor Jake Sullivan and other administration officials met with the Chinese Communist Party Politburo member Yang Jiechi, Chinese foreign minister Wang Yi, and other Chinese officials in Alaska with heated exchanges on China's human rights abuses, cyberattacks, its threats against Taiwan, its crackdown in Xinjiang and Hong Kong, and other issues of U.S. interest. The Chinese side countered: "The U.S. does not have the qualification to speak to China from a position of strength [and] does not serve as a model to others [and] China's development and strengthening is unstoppable."

On October 20, 2021, Biden said he is concerned about Chinese hypersonic missiles, days after China tested a nuclear-capable hypersonic missile that circled the globe before speeding towards its target.

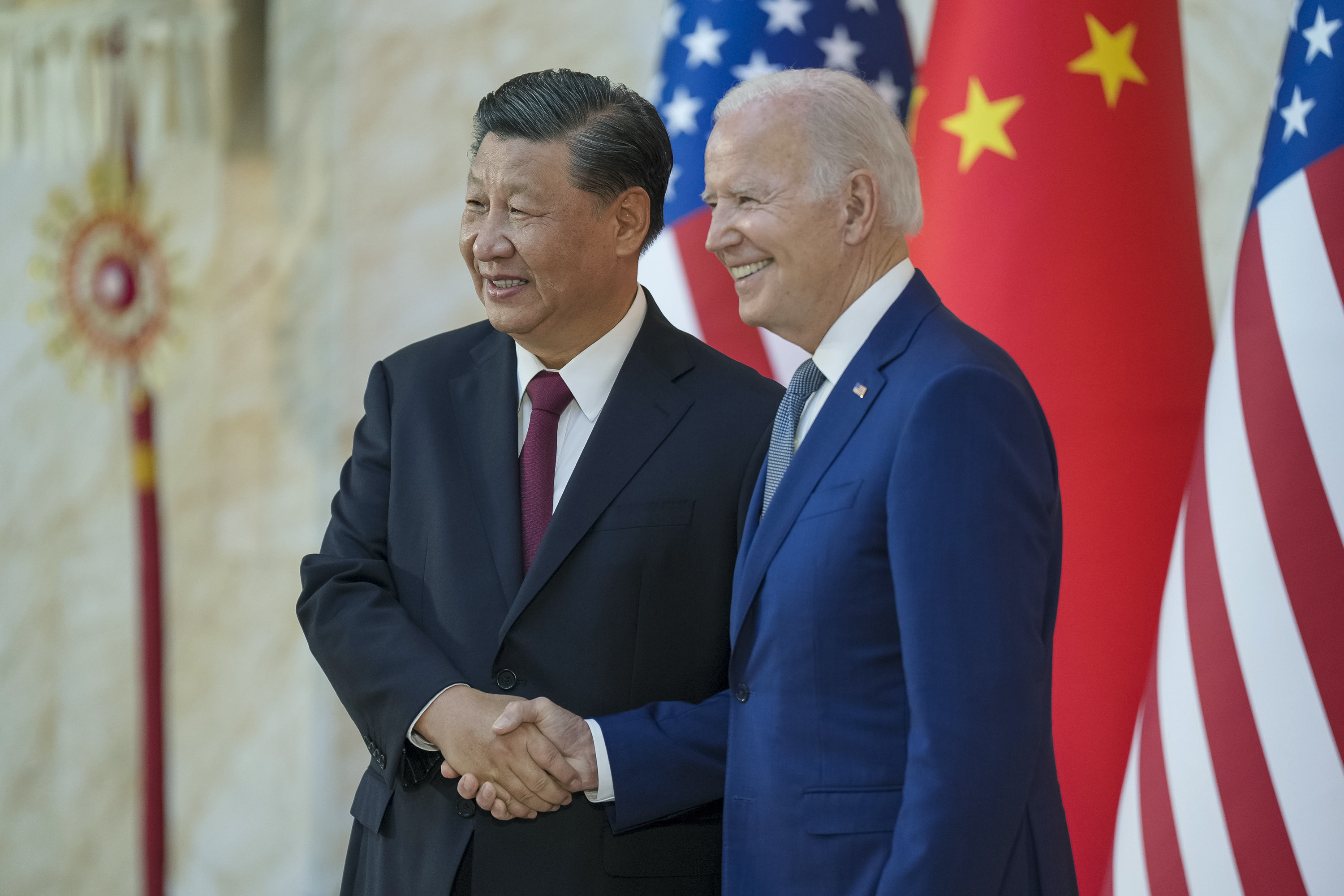
Biden meets with Chinese leader Xi Jinping at the G20 summit in Bali on November 14, 2022.

The U.S. took steps to restrict TikTok over national-security concerns related to its Chinese ownership. In December 2022, Biden signed the No TikTok on Government Devices Act, barring TikTok on federal devices. In April 2024, he signed the Protecting Americans from Foreign Adversary Controlled Applications Act, which set a deadline for apps owned by foreign adversaries, such as TikTok's parent company ByteDance, to either be sold to a non-adversary owner or be banned in the United States. TikTok's U.S. ban was not enforced; service was restored and the enforcement deadline was repeatedly extended.

=== Taiwan ===
On September 18, 2022, Biden said that U.S. forces would defend Taiwan if China launched an invasion. China condemned the remark, saying it sent the wrong signal to supporters of Taiwanese independence. The policy was stated in contrast to Biden's previous exclusion of U.S. forces in support for Ukraine in its current conflict with Russia.

=== Myanmar ===
On February 1, 2021, Biden condemned the Myanmar coup d'état and called for the release of detained officials. Biden also left open the door to re-imposing sanctions on the country, saying in a statement that "[t]he United States removed sanctions on Burma over the past decade based on progress toward democracy. The reversal of that progress will necessitate an immediate review of our sanction laws and authorities, followed by appropriate action."

On March 5, 2021, Biden imposed sanctions on Myanmar's Ministry of Home Affairs and Ministry of Defence and certain junta conglomerates. On March 22, 2021, Secretary of State Antony Blinken announced sanctions on several military generals in response to a violent crackdown on peaceful protests.

=== Afghanistan ===
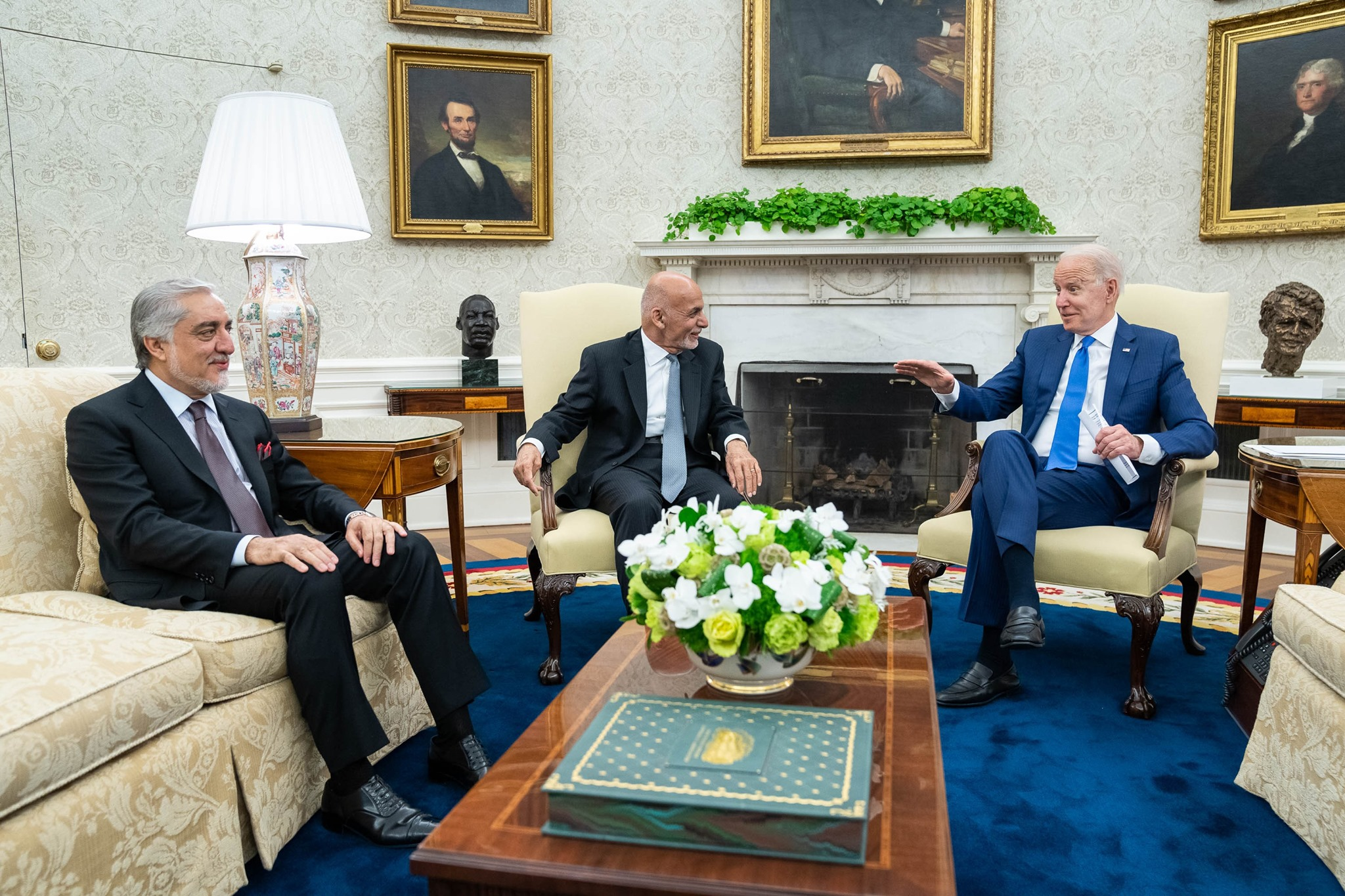
Biden meeting with Afghan president Ashraf Ghani and chairman Abdullah Abdullah, June 2021

President Biden delivers remarks on Afghanistan (transcript).

In February 2020, the Trump administration made a deal with the Taliban to completely withdraw U.S. forces by May 1, 2021. In April 2021, President Biden formally announced that American troops would instead withdraw from Afghanistan by September 11, 2021, which would signal an end to the U.S.'s longest war. According to Princeton professor Julian E. Zelizer, Biden "clearly learned a great deal from his time in the Obama presidency", and demonstrated that "he is a politician capable of learning and evolving, contrary to some of the skeptics in the primaries who thought he didn't understand how politics had changed." According to Washington Post journalist Steven Levingston, "Obama listened to military leaders who advised him that withdrawal would be a mistake. Biden, meanwhile, was the top administration official arguing for a much more limited role for American forces in Afghanistan. Later, Biden would go on to say that he could tell by Obama's 'body language' that he agreed with that assessment — even though he ultimately rejected it."

Soon after the withdrawal of U.S. troops started, the Taliban launched an offensive against the Afghan government, quickly advancing in front of a collapsing Afghan Armed Forces. President Biden defended the withdrawal, saying "I trust the capacity of the Afghan military, who is better trained, better equipped and ... more competent in terms of conducting war."

By early July 2021, most of the American troops in Afghanistan were withdrawn. Biden addressed the withdrawal, stating that: "The likelihood there's going to be the Taliban overrunning everything and owning the whole country is highly unlikely." On August 15, amid an offensive by the Taliban, the Afghan government collapsed, Afghan president Ashraf Ghani fled the country and Kabul fell to the Taliban. Biden reacted by ordering 6,000 American troops to assist in the evacuation of American personnel and Afghan allies. He has been criticized over the manner of the American withdrawal.

On August 16, Biden addressed the "messy" situation, taking responsibility for it ("the buck stops with me"), and admitting that the situation "unfolded more quickly than we had anticipated". He defended his decision to withdraw, saying that Americans should not be "dying in a war that Afghan forces are not willing to fight for themselves", since the "Afghan military collapsed [against the Taliban], sometimes without trying to fight". Biden partly attributed the lack of early evacuation of Afghan civilians to the Afghan government's opposition of a "mass exodus" which they thought would cause a "crisis of confidence".

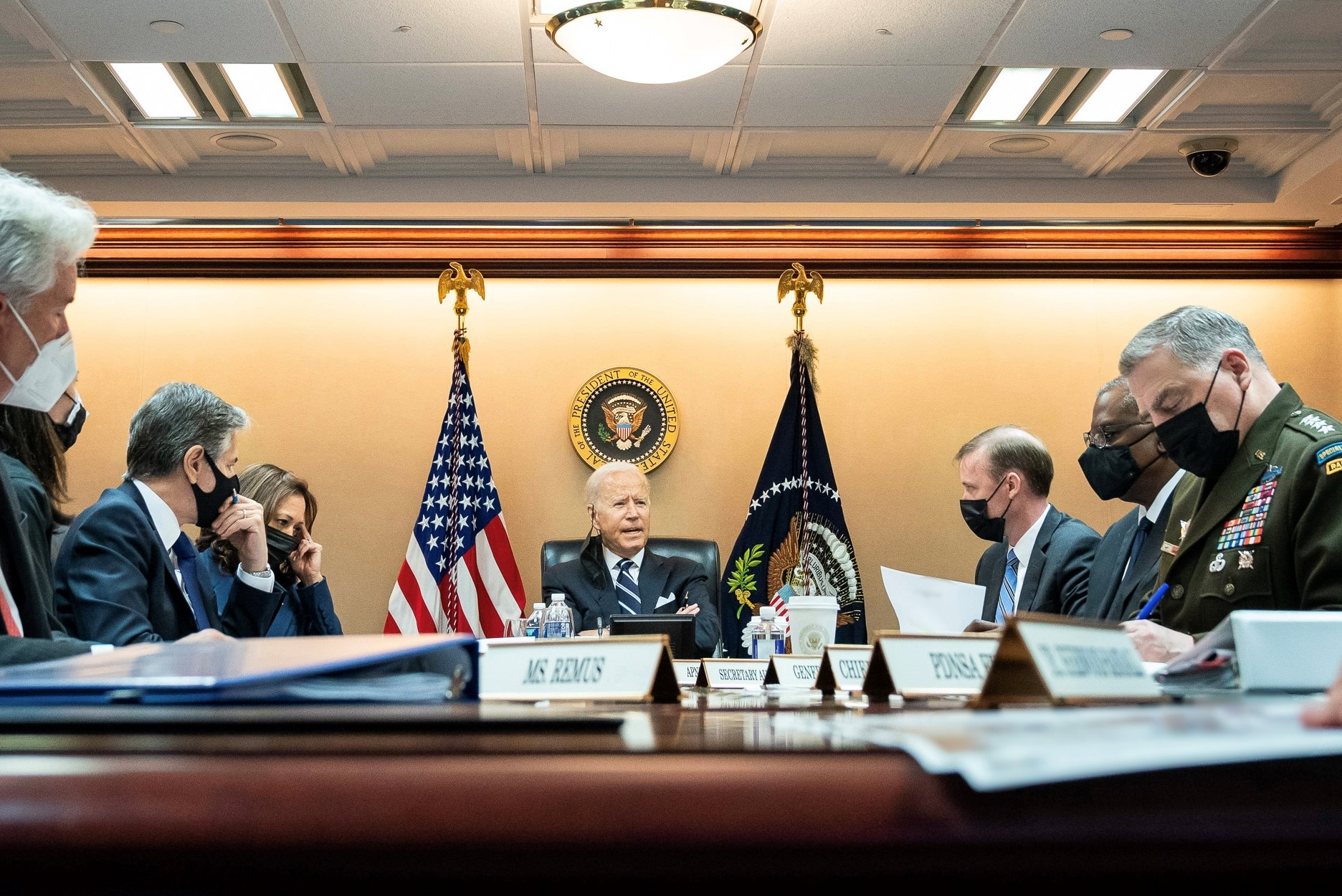
President Biden discussing the fall of Kabul with the National Security Council, August 2021

On August 26, a suicide attack was carried out by the Islamic State of Iraq and the Levant - Khorasan Province at the Hamid Karzai International Airport, killing more than 170 people, including at least 62 Afghan civilians, 13 US service members, two British nationals and the child of a third British national. Biden made a public address after the attack, in which he honored the American service members who were killed, calling them "heroes" and saying they lost their lives "in the service of liberty", and stated that the US had evacuated more than 100,000 Americans, Afghans, and others. He expressed deep sorrow for the Afghan victims as well. Biden said to those who wished harm upon the US that "we will hunt you down and make you pay." Biden received increasingly harsh criticism from both Republicans and Democrats in the US Congress, with Republicans calling for his resignation or for his impeachment.

After the Taliban takeover of Afghanistan, the Biden administration froze about $9 billion in assets belonging to the Afghan central bank, blocking the Taliban from accessing these billions of dollars in reserves held in U.S. bank accounts.

In February 2022, Biden signed an executive order that seeks to unfreeze approximately $3.5 billion of Afghan assets in the U.S. for the purpose of humanitarian assistance in Afghanistan.

On July 31, 2022, Al-Qaida leader Ayman al-Zawahiri was killed in Kabul by an American drone strike approved by Biden.

=== Iran ===
Relations with Iran during the Biden administration centered on attempts to revive the 2015 nuclear agreement amid sanctions, cyberattacks, and proxy conflicts. U.S. officials sought a return to the JCPOA, but Vienna talks stalled, as Iran increased uranium enrichment and imposed retaliatory sanctions, while the U.S. imposed new sanctions over missile programs, oil exports, and human rights abuses.

Proxy attacks on U.S. bases continued, intensifying after the Gaza war in late 2023, and were met with American strikes. The period also saw disputes over the assassination of Qasem Soleimani, and military escalations across the Gulf region. In 2023, a breakthrough occurred with a U.S.–Iran prisoner swap and the release of frozen Iranian funds, though indirect diplomacy remained fragile. Later accusations of Iranian cyber interference in the 2024 U.S. election, along with alleged assassination plots in the U.S., further strained relations. By late 2024, relations remained tense and adversarial.

=== Saudi Arabia and Yemen ===
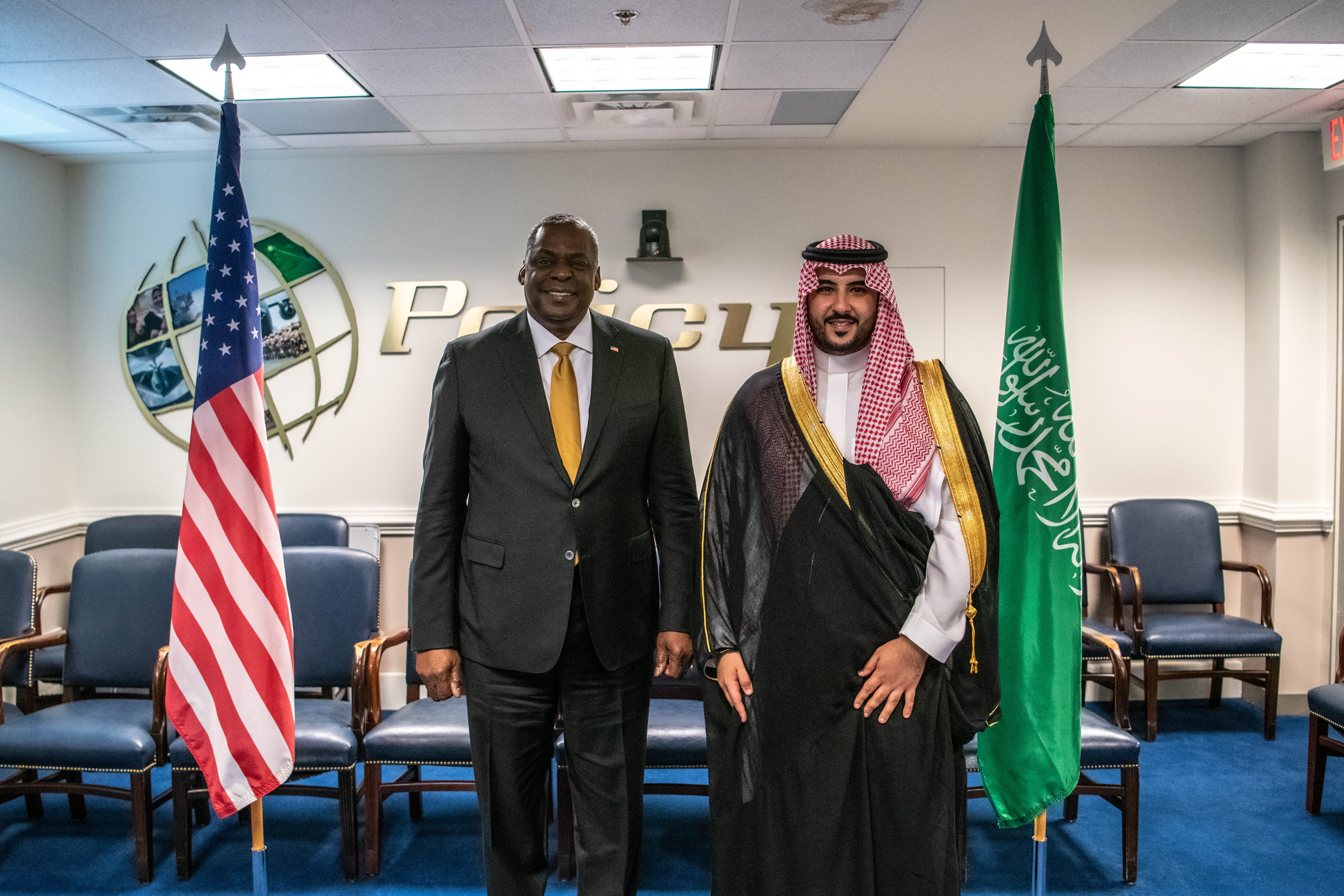
Secretary of Defense Lloyd Austin and Saudi Arabia's deputy minister of defense Prince Khalid bin Salman, July 2021

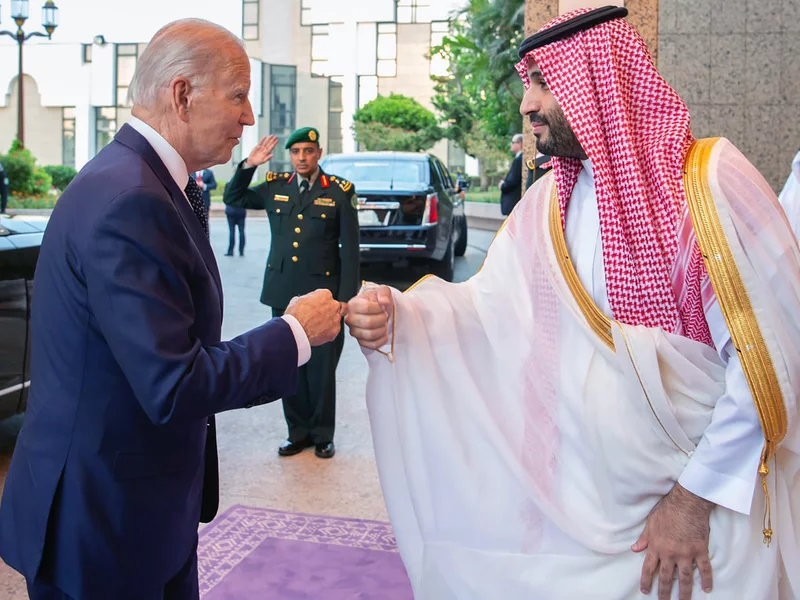
President Joe Biden and Saudi crown prince Mohammed bin Salman bumps fist at Al-Salam Palace in Jeddah, in July 2022.

Biden ordered a halt in the arms sales to Saudi Arabia and the United Arab Emirates which the Trump administration had previously agreed to. Two years after Jamal Khashoggi's assassination, Avril Haines, the Director of National Intelligence under Biden's administration, announced that the intelligence report into the case against the Saudi government would be declassified. It was reported that Crown Prince Mohammed bin Salman would be blamed for the murder, as was concluded by the CIA.

On February 4, 2021, the Biden administration announced that the U.S. was ending its support for the Saudi-led bombing campaign in Yemen. President Biden in his first visit to the State Department as president said "this war has to end" and that the conflict has created "a humanitarian and strategic catastrophe". However, the details of the end of American involvement in the war have yet to be released as of April 2021.

In September 2021, Biden's national security adviser Jake Sullivan met in Saudi Arabia with Crown Prince Bin Salman to discuss the high oil prices. The record-high energy prices were driven by a global surge in demand as the world quit the economic recession caused by COVID-19. The Biden administration was pressed on potential oil deals with Saudi Arabia, Venezuela, and Iran that would have them increase their oil production. However, so far, Saudi Arabia and the United Arab Emirates have declined requests from the US.

As a presidential candidate, Joe Biden had vowed to make the Saudis "pay the price" and make them a "pariah" state, citing the Kingdom's involvement in the assassination of Jamal Khashoggi. But, in June 2022, the White House confirmed that Biden was to visit Saudi Arabia and meet Crown Prince Mohammed bin Salman, during his Middle East trip in July. The announcement came after inflation in the US rose to a 40-year high. The Russian invasion of Ukraine also had an impact on the oil and gas prices in the US. Biden repeatedly appealed to the Saudis to increase oil production, but the Kingdom turned down such requests. Biden's planned visit was seen as a move to seek Saudi assistance to ease the oil and gas prices at home. However, human rights activists and Democratic lawmakers warned Biden that the visit could send signals to Saudi that their horrific human rights violations could be exempted. Saudi dissidents living in the US said that as Saudi activists who were wronged by Prince Mohammed, they "feel betrayed by Biden". Son of Saad Aljabri, Khalid AlJabri said Biden's meeting with MbS would be "equivalent of a presidential pardon for murder". Democratic representative Adam Schiff also criticized the visit saying, "I wouldn't go. I wouldn't shake his hand. This is someone who butchered an American resident, cut him up into pieces and in the most terrible and premeditated way."

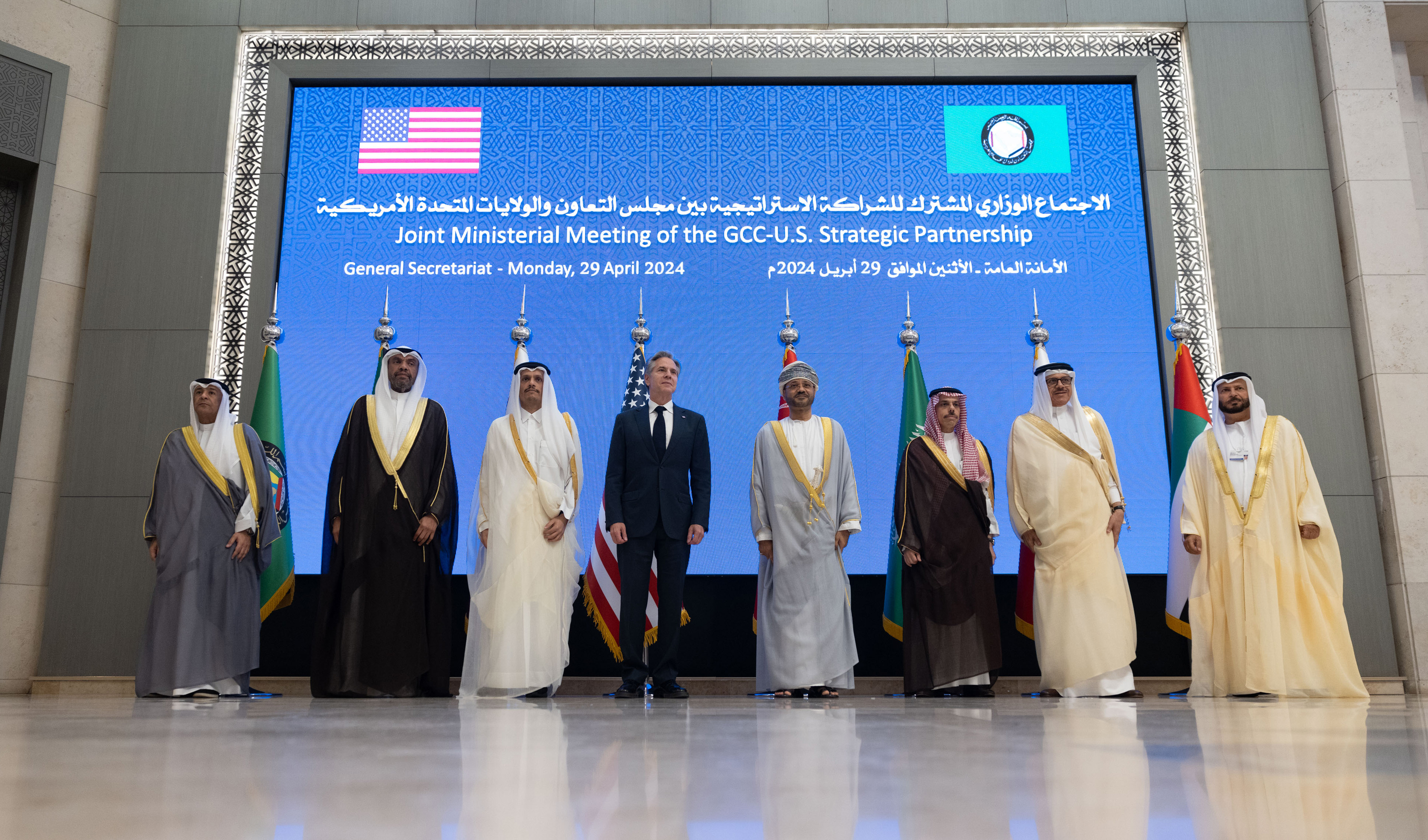
Secretary of State Antony Blinken and foreign ministers of the Gulf Cooperation Council member states in Riyadh, Saudi Arabia, April 19, 2024

On July 10, 2022, president Biden defended his trip to Saudi Arabia, saying humans rights were on his agenda. In an op-ed, he wrote that he aims to "reorient and not rupture relations with a country that's been a strategic partner for 80 years", and that Saudi Arabia has helped to restore unity among the six countries of Gulf Cooperation Council and has fully supported the truce in the context of the Yemen war.

Ahead of Biden's visit to Saudi Arabia, reports revealed that the Biden administration could possibly lift a ban on sales of offensive weapons to Riyadh. However, U.S. national security adviser Jake Sullivan they were focused on a "real ceasefire", and on Saudi efforts to end the war. After the meeting with Saudi officials, Biden announced that the Kingdom committed to extend the truce in Yemen. On August 2, 2022, the State Department approved the potential sale of 300 MIM-104E Guidance Enhanced Missile-Tactical Ballistic Missiles (GEM-T) for the Patriot missile defense system to Saudi Arabia. It also approved support equipment, spares and technical support to the Arab nation. In addition, the State Department also approved the potential sale of 96 Terminal High Altitude Area Defense (THAAD) missile defense system interceptors and support equipment to the UAE. However, Human Rights Watch said the US should suspend sales of both offensive and defensive arms to Saudi Arabia and the UAE, which have used American weapons in unlawful airstrikes. HRW said a policy reversal by the US could lead to added rights violations in Yemen.

=== United Arab Emirates ===
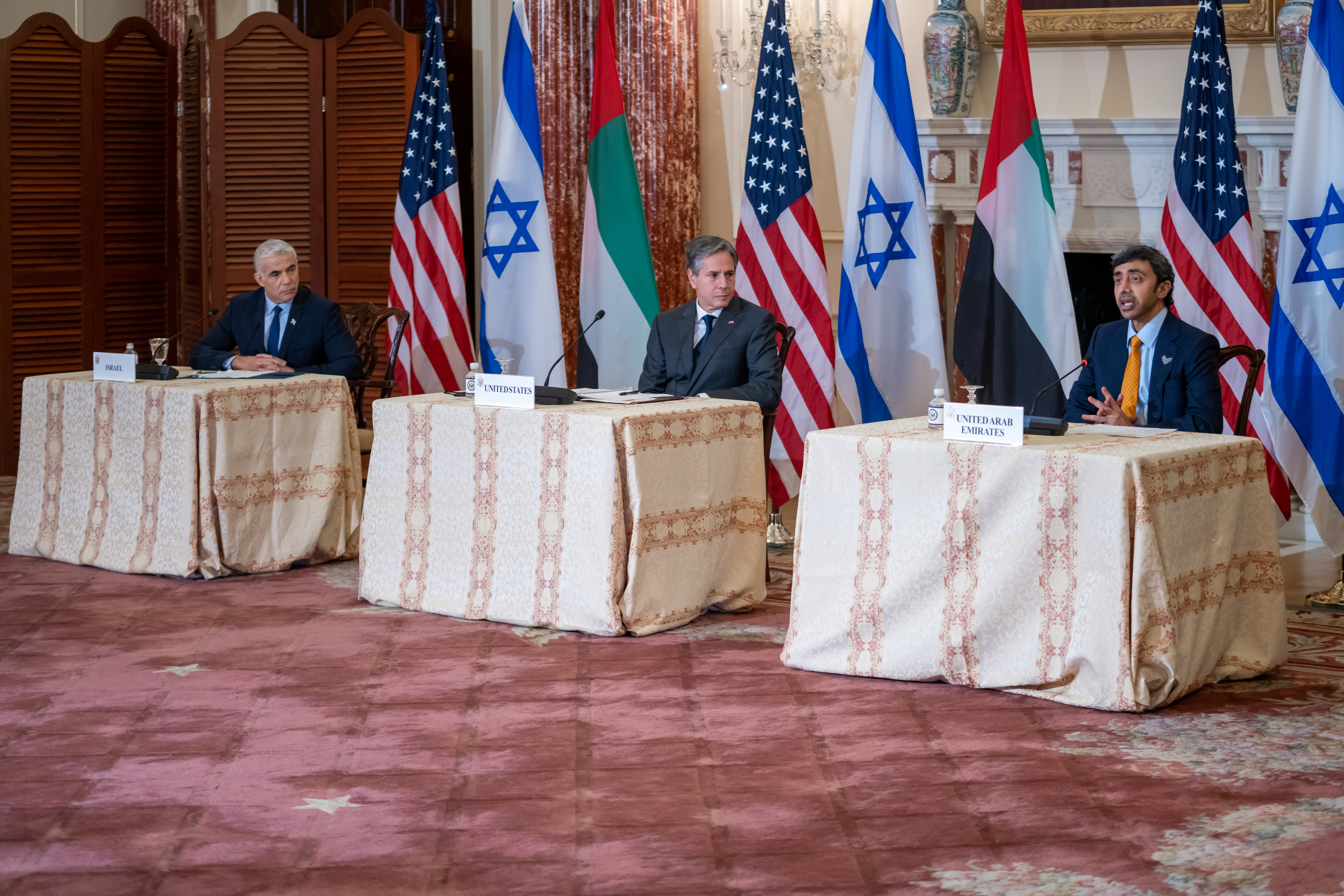
Secretary Blinken, Israeli foreign minister Yair Lapid and UAE foreign minister Abdullah bin Zayed Al Nahyan on October 13, 2021

The U.S. authorities indicted Thomas J. Barrack Jr., an outside adviser to Donald Trump during and after the 2016 United States presidential election campaign. They alleged he acted as an unregistered foreign lobbyist for the United Arab Emirates. Barrack was also accused of obstruction of justice by giving false statements to the investigators. He was found not guilty on all charges in November 2022. The DOJ also prosecuted some men for funneling more than $3.5 million to Hillary Clinton from George Nader, the royal adviser of the UAE.

While federal prosecutors accused the Emirates of interfering in American politics from both sides, the relations with the Arab nation during Biden's presidency didn't witness much of the expected changes. The UAE was seen escaping its blunder-filled history of relations with the US, despite Biden's repetitive criticism against the Emirates' human rights violations and its attempts of infiltrating the US politics. Moreover, the Biden administration also permitted the arms sales of $23 billion to the UAE, which was initiated by Donald Trump and involved a transfer of sophisticated weaponry like the F-35 fighter jets. The US Justice Department did not charge any Emirati in the case. However, Barrack's indictment identified three UAE officials who were hosts at his reception in the Gulf nation after Trump's 2016 elections, and two others who were involved. Amongst the hosts was Abu Dhabi Crown Prince Mohamed bin Zayed, the UAE's national security adviser Tahnoun bin Zayed and director of the Emirati intelligence service, Ali Mohammed Hammad Al Shamsi. The fourth Emirati official was Abdullah Khalifa Al Ghafli, who "tasked" Barrack to push Emirati interests with America. Another official was Yousef Al Otaiba, who asked to remain anonymous in discussions over private matters.

On September 23, 2024, the UAE president Mohamed bin Zayed visited the White House to hold meetings with President Biden and Kamala Harris. It marked the first ever meeting of an Emirati President to Washington. Biden and Harris met Mohamed separately, focusing on future bilateral economic and technological relations. Prior to the meeting, Biden received a letter from the lawmakers to raise concerns with the UAE around its military support to the Rapid Support Forces (RSF) in Sudan. Appreciating Biden's efforts towards the Sudan crisis, the lawmakers stated that the Emirati actions could become an obstruction. They urged Biden to address the concerns to Mohammed and press the UAE to cease the support to RSF.

=== Israel ===
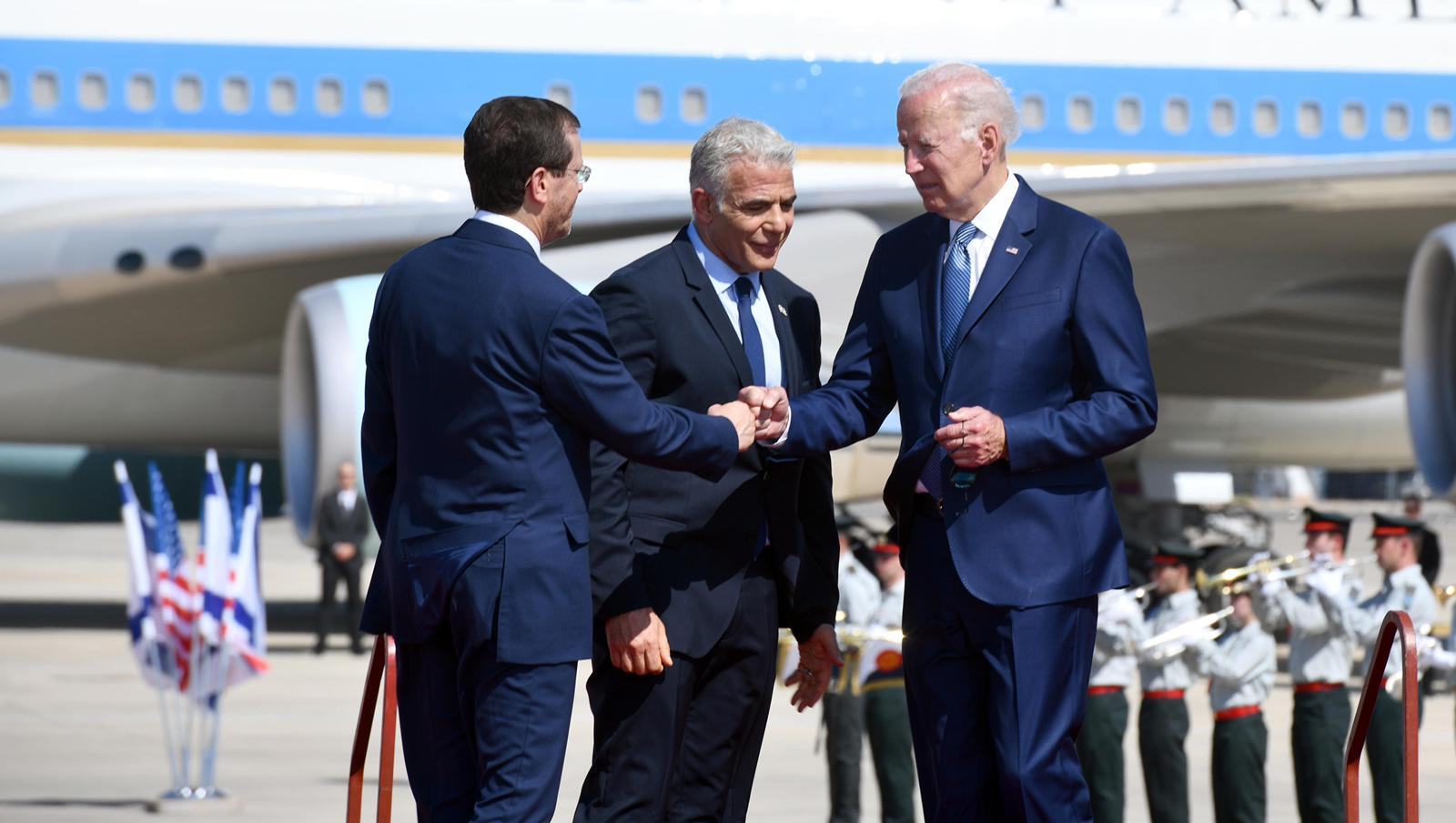
President Biden meets Israeli Prime Minister Yair Lapid and Israeli President Isaac Herzog on his visit to Israel, July 13, 2022.

Early on, the Biden administration addressed Trump's recognition of Jerusalem as the Israeli capital. The White House confirmed that the U.S. Embassy would remain in Jerusalem and it would continue to be recognized as the capital. The administration also expressed support for the Abraham Accords while wanting to expand on them, although it shied away from using that name, instead referring to it simply as "the normalization process".

On May 13, 2021, in the aftermath of the Al-Aqsa mosque conflict, the Biden administration was accused of being indifferent towards the violent conflict between Israeli statehood and the Palestinian minority there. Critics on both sides identified the reaction by the White House as "lame and late".

On May 21, 2021, a ceasefire was brokered between Israel and Hamas after eleven days of clashes. According to Biden, the US will be playing a key role to rebuild damaged infrastructure in the Gaza alongside the Palestinian authority.

==== Gaza War ====
President Biden delivers remarks on the Hamas terrorist attacks in Israel.

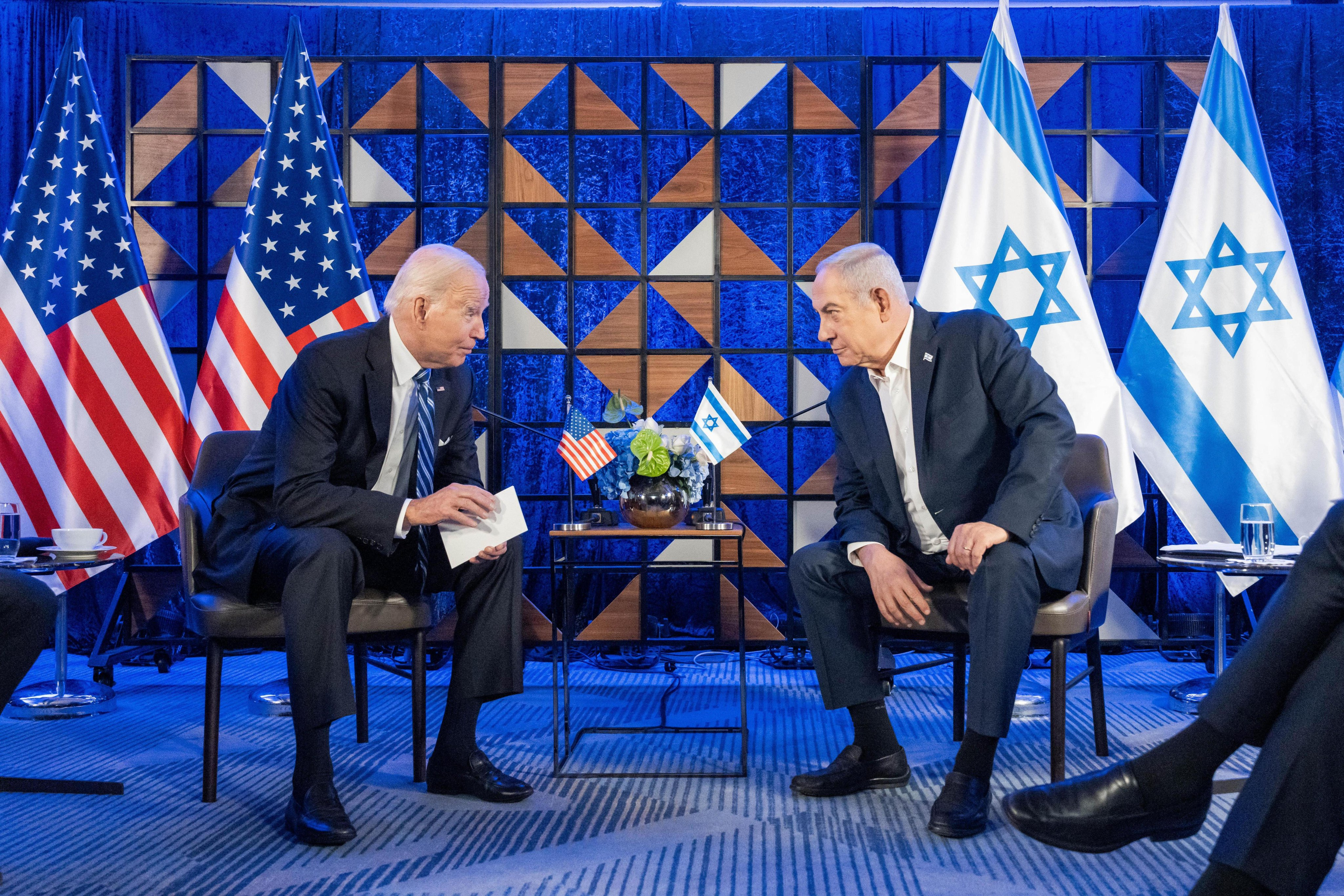
Biden and Israeli prime minister Benjamin Netanyahu, October 18, 2023

After the October 7 attack in Israel, Biden stated, "We stand with Israel" three days later and emphasized the US's role in potentially freeing American hostages in Gaza.

On October 14, Biden condemned the murder of Wadea Al-Fayoume, a six-year-old Muslim boy in Chicago, by the boy's landlord. The murder was an alleged hate crime inspired by the conflict. Biden said, "There is no place in America for hate against anyone."

During a speech at the Human Rights Campaign Dinner on October 15, a protestor chanted "let Gaza live" and "ceasefire now" to which Biden responded that he could not hear the protestor, but then later said "I get it. I'm not sure that's a good thing. No, I'm only joking."

Biden's trip to Jordan to meet King Abdullah II, Abdel Fattah el-Sisi, and Mahmoud Abbas was "mutually" canceled on October 17 and indefinitely postponed.

President Biden traveled to Tel Aviv, Israel on October 18 and met with Prime Minister Benjamin Netanyahu, resulting in humanitarian aid being allowed into Gaza, including food, water, and medicine. During the trip, Biden blamed the al-Ahli Arab Hospital explosion on "an errant rocket fired by a terrorist group in Gaza," citing US intelligence reports. He also promised to ask congress for an "unprecedented support package for Israel's defense," potentially tied to a bill with support for Ukraine, Taiwan, and the Southern Border. Biden called on Congress to pass $14.3 billion in emergency military aid to Israel. Israel already receives $3.8 billion a year in military aid. Biden also announced that the US would send $100 million in humanitarian aid to Gaza and the West Bank.

On November 1, after Jessica Rosenberg, a rabbi and activist from Jewish Voice for Peace, heckled Biden during a speech in Northfield, Minnesota calling for a ceasefire, Biden said, "I think we need a pause. A pause means give time to get the prisoners out."

Starting November 9, Biden negotiated four-hour pauses for civilians to flee every day after his push for three-day pauses failed. Starting on November 23, Israel agreed to a four-day ceasefire for north of Gaza for six hours a day and a complete ceasefire south of Gaza in exchange for hostages taken by Hamas. The deal was brokered by Qatar, Egypt, and the United States.

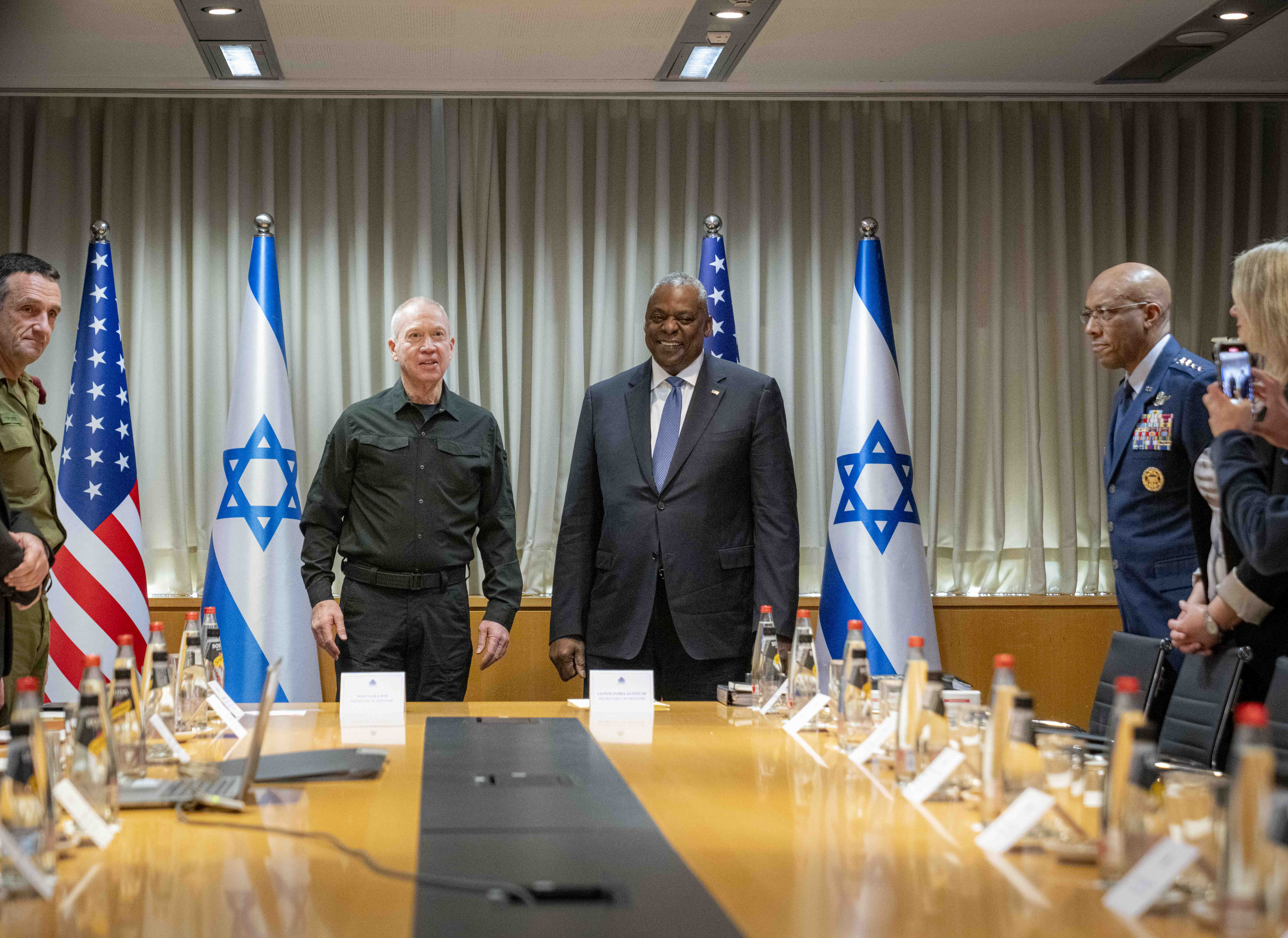
Secretary of Defense Lloyd Austin, Israeli Defense Minister Yoav Gallant, Joint Chiefs of Staff Chairman Charles Q. Brown Jr. and Israeli Chief of General Staff Herzi Halevi in Tel Aviv, Israel, December 18, 2023

Ian Bremmer, an American political scientist, stated the Biden administration's position unconditionally supporting Israel had left him as isolated on the world stage as Russia's president Vladimir Putin. Biden has reportedly expressed frustration with Netanyahu's handling of the war, although this has not led to a major shift in American policy.

Congressional oversight on arms sales has been sidestepped by the Biden administration on two occasions in December 2023. Usually the Arms Export Control Act would require the State Department, on behalf of the president, to provide U.S. Congress advance notification of government-to-government foreign military sales of defense equipment. But the secretary of state Antony Blinken certified the existence of an "emergency" and therefore the requirement was lifted twice which raised objections from lawmakers from the Democratic Party.

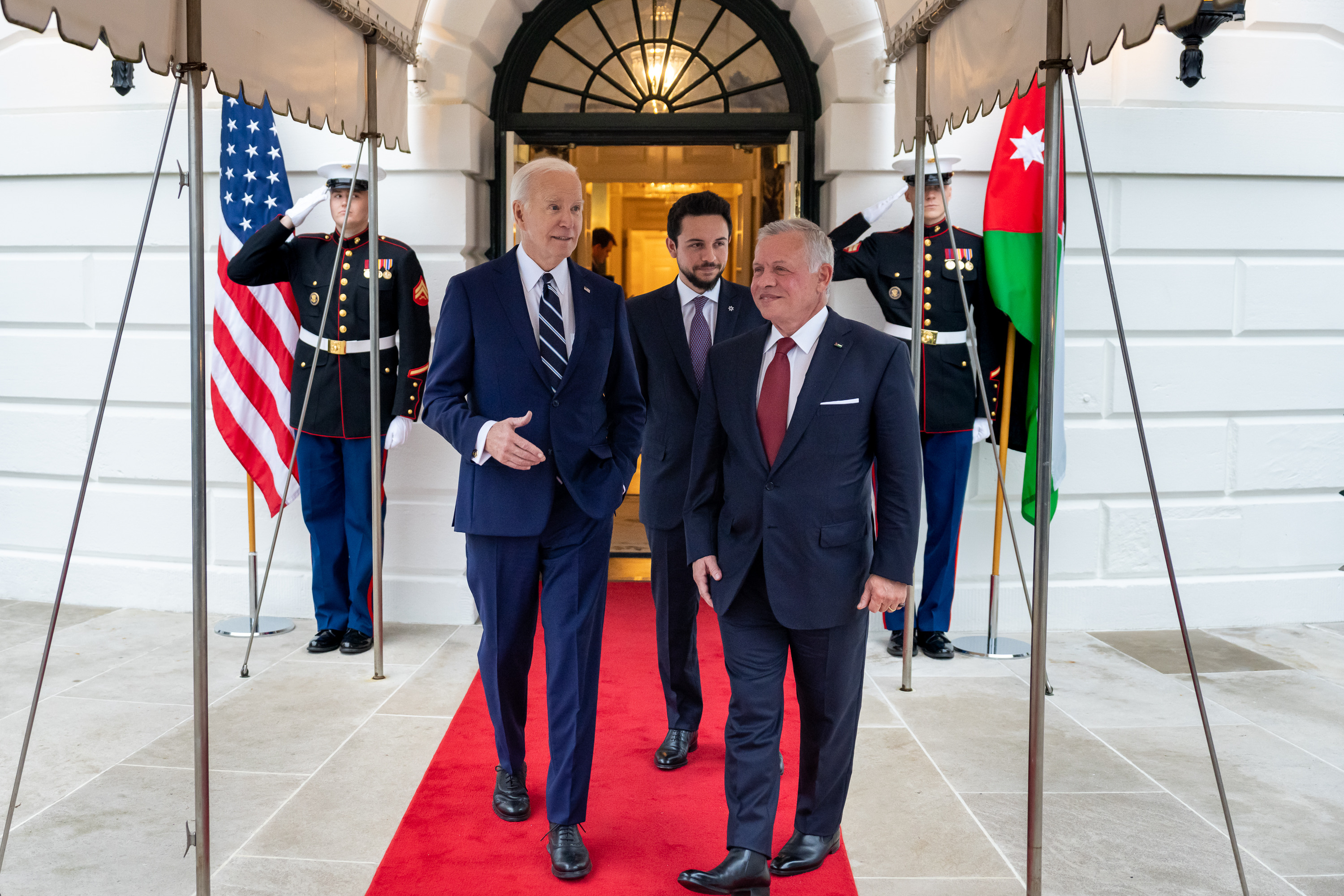
Abdullah II of Jordan and Crown Prince Hussein with President Biden in February 2024

In February 2024, the Biden administration warned the government of Israel against its announced advance against Rafah, and NBC news reported that Biden "has been venting his frustration in recent private conversations, some of them with campaign donors, over his inability to persuade Israel to change its military tactics in the Gaza Strip". On February 16, 2024, The Wall Street Journal reported that the administration is pushing for a cease-fire deal but on the other hand is preparing another delivery of bombs and other weapons and that the administration has to notify "congressional committee leaders who would need to approve the transfer." On February 20, the U.S. government vetoed a U.N. Security Council resolution demanding a cease-fire in Gaza.

After the killing of Palestinian civilians receiving food aid on February 29, Biden expressed that the current level of aid flowing into Gaza was insufficient. On March 3, US military began airdropping food aid into Gaza. Some experts called the US airdrops performative and claimed they would do little to alleviate the food situation in Gaza. In July 2024, following Biden's decision not to seek re-election, Palestinian advocacy groups stated they believed that the war would define Biden's presidential legacy.

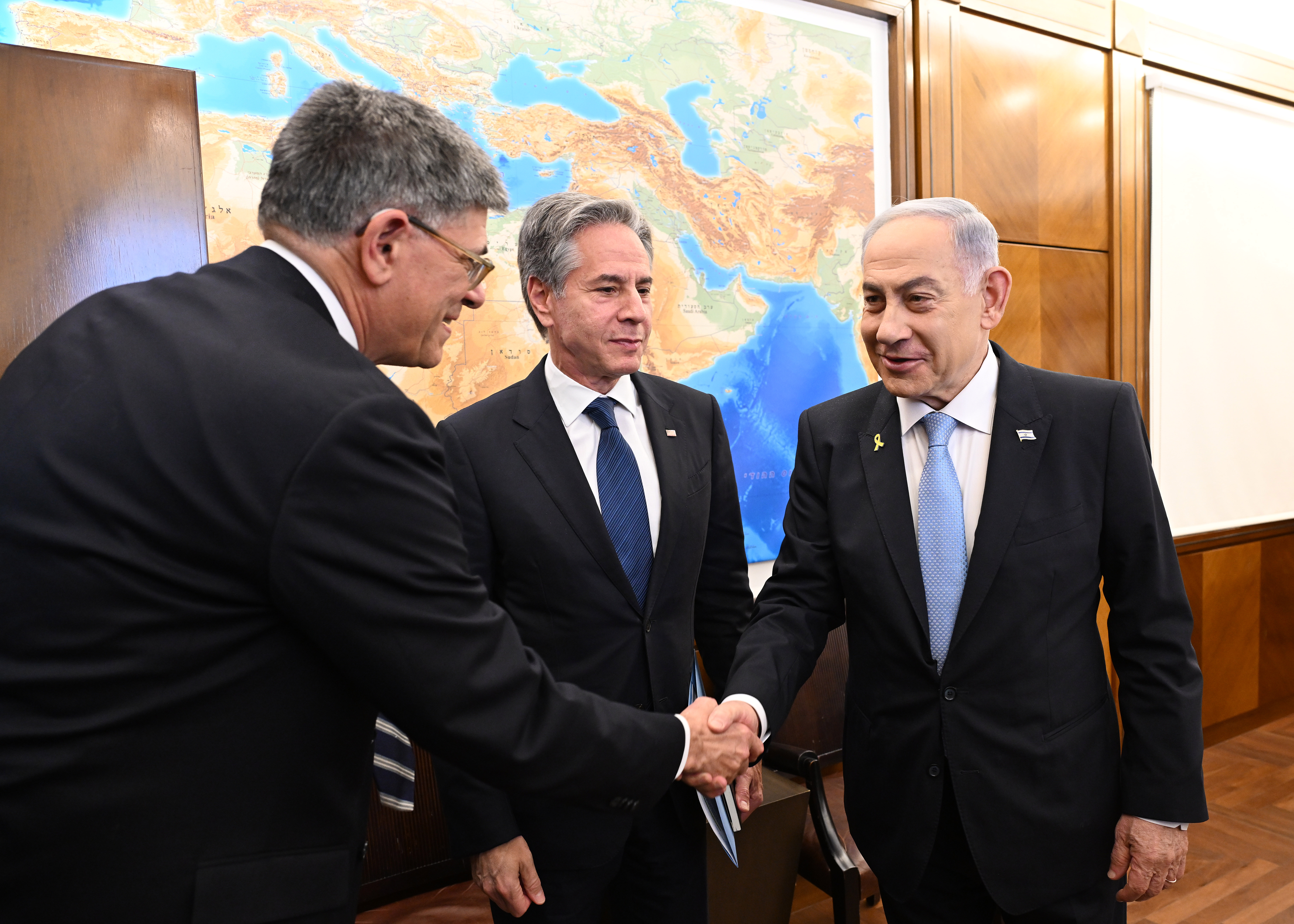
Israeli Prime Minister Netanyahu with US ambassador to Israel Jack Lew (left) and US Secretary of State Antony Blinken, August 19, 2024

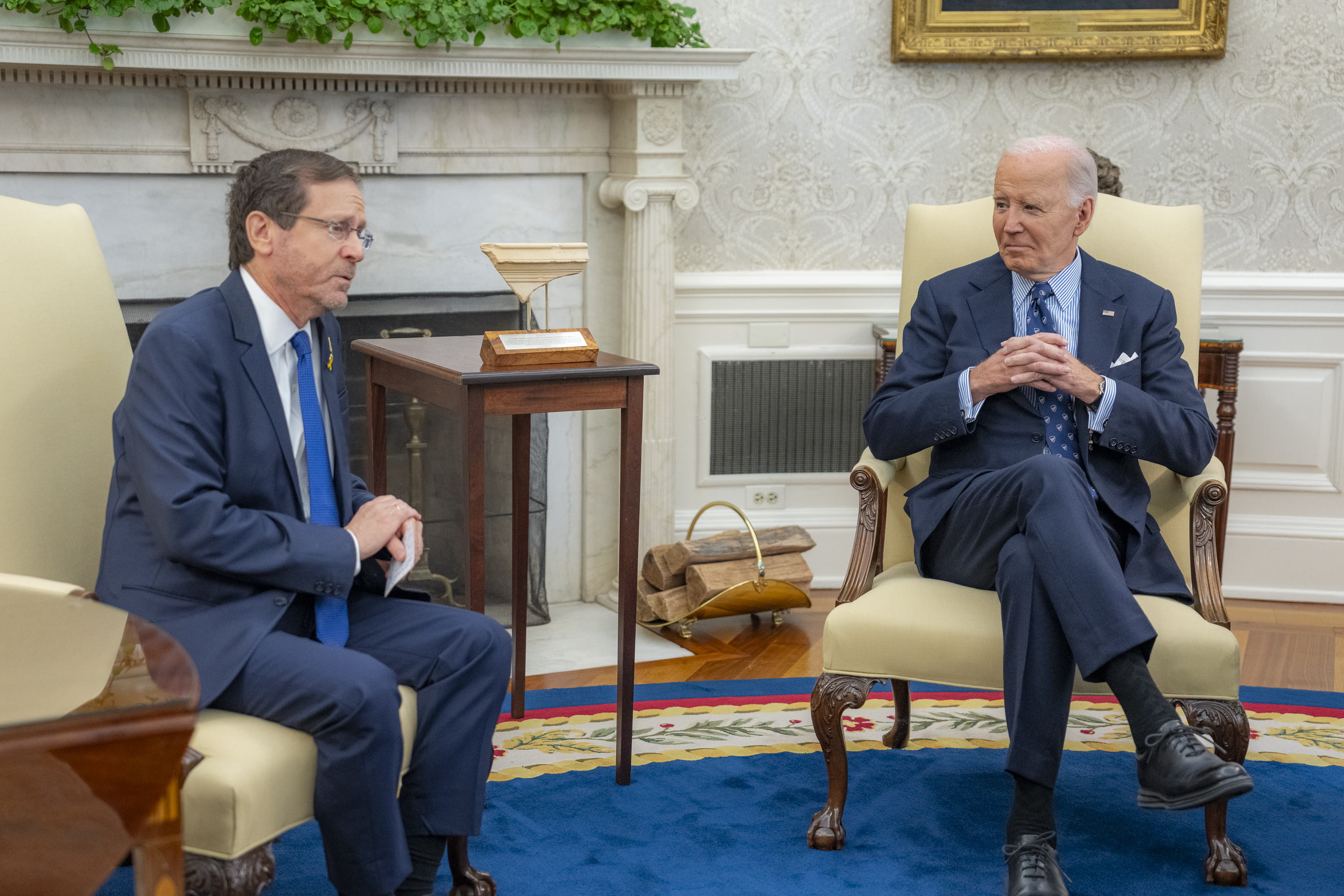
President Biden and Israeli President Isaac Herzog, November 12, 2024

On March 30, 2024, the Biden administration authorized $2.5 billion in weapons transfers to Israel. On April 24, 2024, Biden signed a $95 billion security package which included around $17 billion in military aid for Israel. In June 2024, the United States officially signed a Letter of Offer and Acceptance, allowing Israel to purchase 25 additional Lockheed Martin F-35 stealth fighter jets for $3 billion.

On July 10, 2024, the Biden administration resumed shipments of the 500-pound bombs to Israel, which were halted in May over concerns about the humanitarian impact of Israel's use of them in killing Palestinians in Gaza. On August 9, 2024, the Department of State said the United States would send Israel an additional $3.5 billion to spend on US-made weapons and military equipment. On August 13, 2024, the Department of State announced that the U.S. had approved a $20 billion weapons package sale to Israel, which included fighter jets and advanced air-to-air missiles.

On September 17, 2024, thousands of handheld pagers used by Hezbollah simultaneously exploded across Lebanon and Syria. The attack came just a day after the Biden administration's special envoy Amos Hochstein visited Israel and warned Benjamin Netanyahu against provoking a major escalation in Lebanon.

On November 20, 2024, a UN Security Council draft resolution that demanded an immediate and unconditional ceasefire in the Gaza Strip was vetoed by the U.S. whereas all other members voted in favor. The draft resolution would have rejected "any effort to starve Palestinians" and demanded the facilitation of full, rapid, safe and unhindered entry of aid at scale to and throughout the Strip and its delivery to all those in need. On January 15, 2025, a ceasefire proposal backed by Biden was adopted just days before his leaving office.

=== Palestine ===
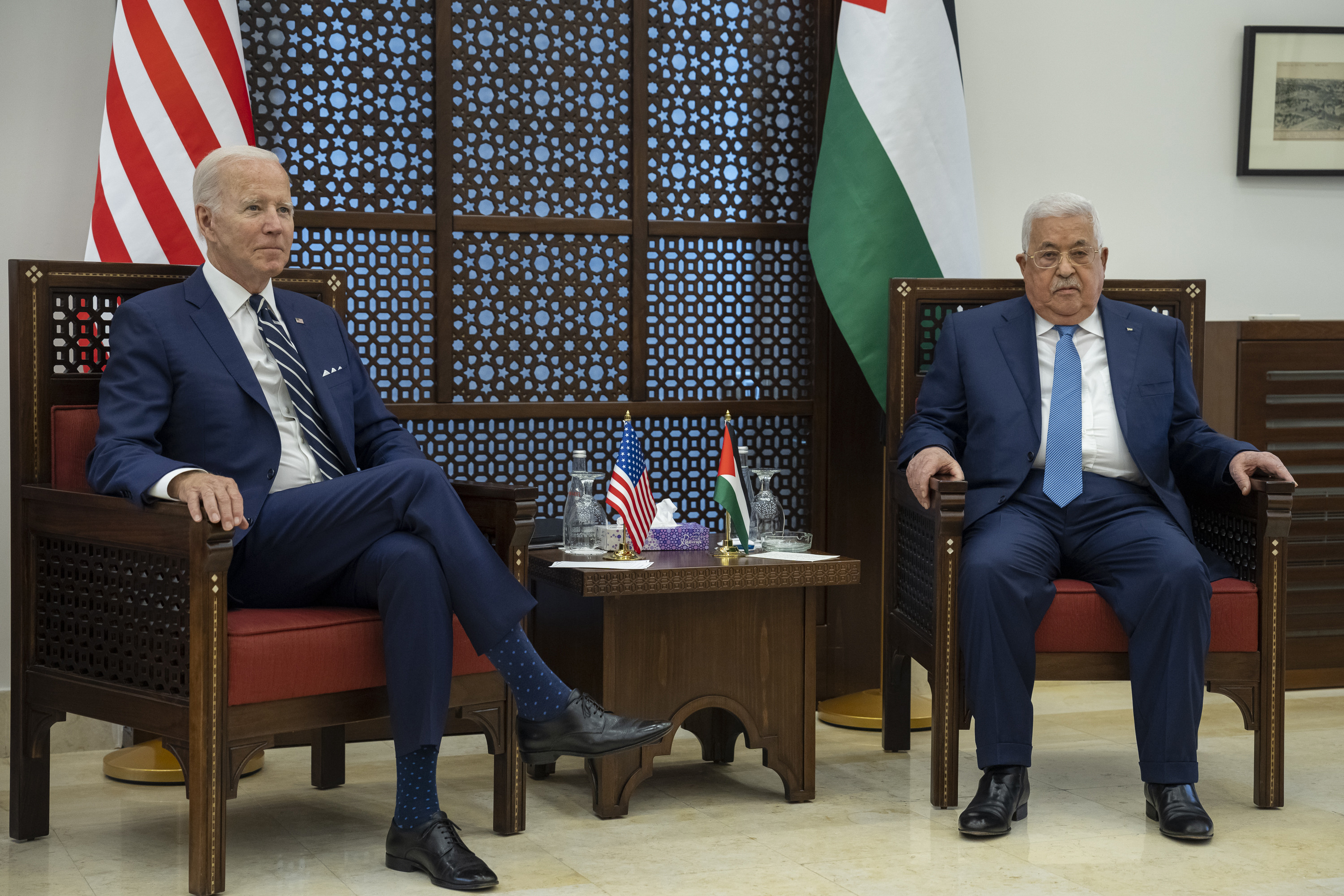
Biden with Palestinian president Mahmoud Abbas at the Palestinian presidential palace in Bethlehem, West Bank, July 15, 2022

During a July 2022 visit to Israel, Biden stressed the importance of keeping the two-state vision alive. He met with Palestinian National Authority President Mahmoud Abbas and announced a new aid package to the Palestinians. During the administration of his predecessor Donald Trump, U.S. contributions to the United Nations Relief and Works Agency for Palestine Refugees had been defunded. On the Israeli end, Prime Minister Yair Lapid reaffirmed his position on a two-state solution.

=== Armenian genocide ===
On April 24, 2021, the Biden administration declared that the Turkish killings of Armenians at the start of the 20th century were a genocide. He is the first U.S. president to ever officially recognize the Armenian genocide.

=== Russia ===
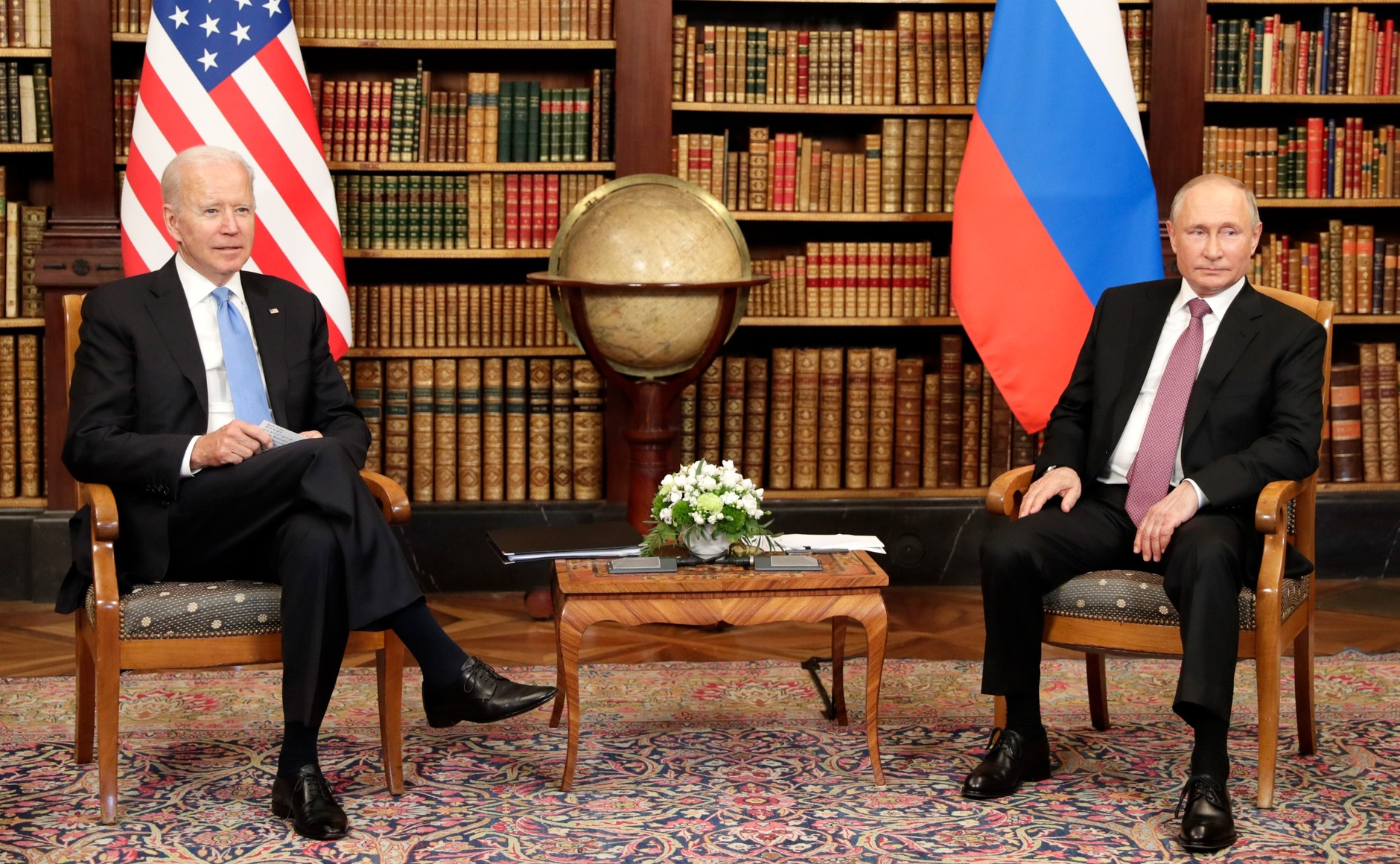
Biden and Russian president Vladimir Putin at the 2021 Russia–United States summit in Geneva, Switzerland

On the day of Biden's inauguration, the Russian government urged the new U.S. administration to take a "more constructive" approach in talks over the extension of the 2010 New START treaty, the sole remaining agreement limiting the number of U.S. and Russian long-range nuclear warheads. In Biden's first telephone call as president with Russian President Vladimir Putin, on January 26, 2021, Biden and Putin agreed to extend the New START treaty (which was set to expire in February 2021) by an additional five years.

Biden and his administration condemned human rights violations by the Russian authorities, calling for the release of detained dissident and anti-corruption activist Alexei Navalny, his wife, and the thousands of Russians who had demonstrated in his support; the U.S. called for the unconditional release of Navalny and the protestors and a credible investigation into Navalny's poisoning. On March 2, 2021, the U.S. and European Union imposed coordinated additional sanctions on Russian officials, as well as the FSB and GRU, over Navalny's poisoning and imprisonment. The State Department also expanded existing sanctions from the Chemical and Biological Weapons Control and Warfare Elimination Act that had been imposed after the poisoning of Skripal. The Biden administration also planned to impose sanctions against Russia because of the 2020 SolarWinds cyberespionage campaign, which compromised the computer systems of nine federal agencies. Biden's national security adviser Jake Sullivan said the response "will include a mix of tools seen and unseen, and it will not simply be sanctions."

The Biden administration's comprehensive review into Russian activities has included an examination of reports that the Russian government offered bounties to kill U.S. troops in Afghanistan. The Biden administration said intelligence community has only "low to moderate" confidence in reports due to the fact that the bounty reports originated from "detainee reporting and because of the difficult operating environment in Afghanistan." Biden called Russian president Vladimir Putin a "killer" in an ABC News interview, and said that Russia would pay a price for election meddling.

President Biden delivers remarks on Russia's invasion of Ukraine.

On May 19, 2021, the Biden administration lifted CAATSA sanctions on the Nord Stream 2 pipeline project between Russia and Germany. Despite Biden's personal opposition to the project, the U.S. State Department says that it concluded that it was in the "U.S. national interest" to waive the sanctions. Russian deputy foreign minister Sergei Ryabkov welcomed the move as "a chance for a gradual transition toward the normalization of our bilateral ties."

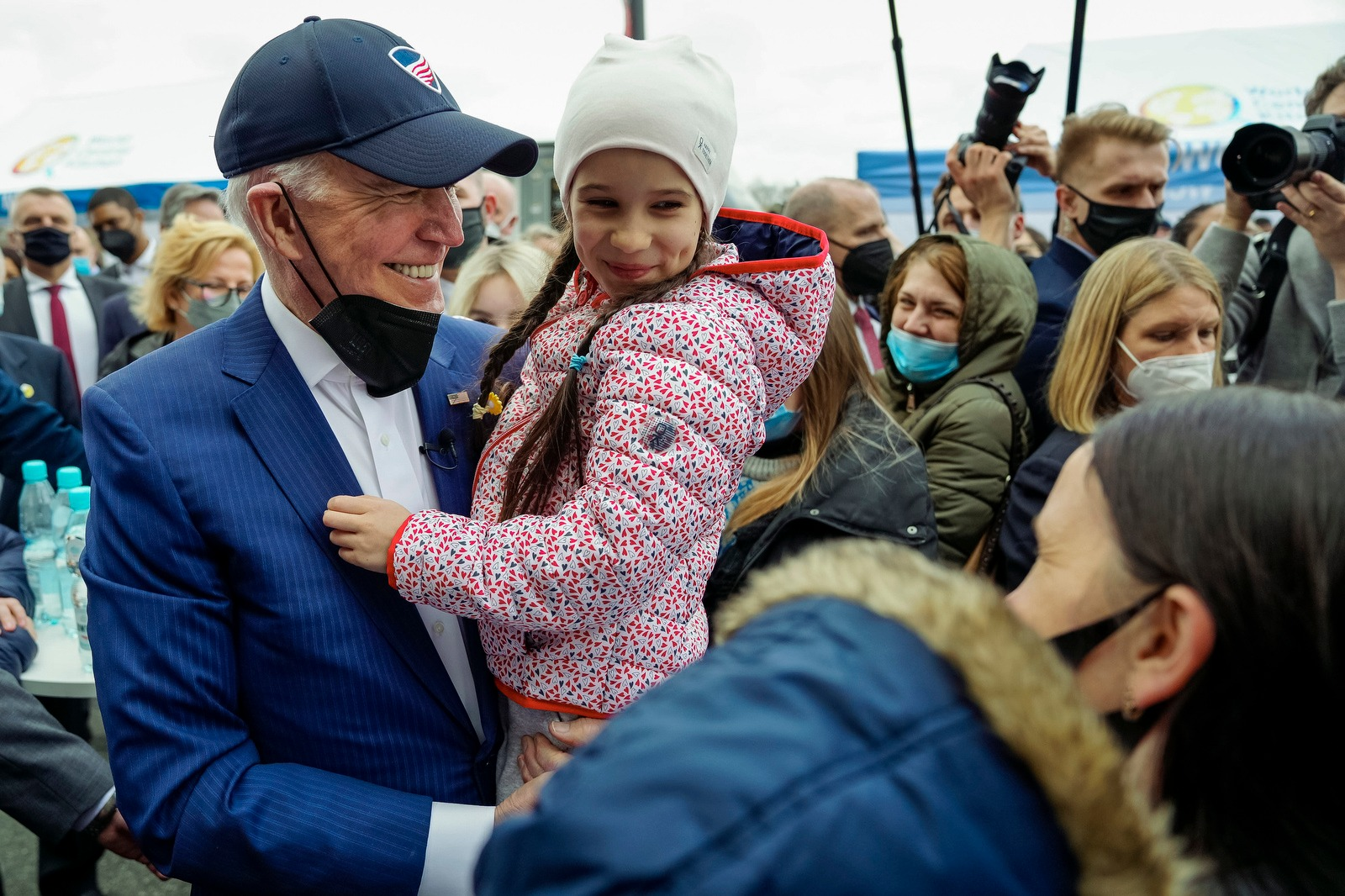
Biden visits Ukrainian refugees in Warsaw, Poland, March 2022.

On June 16, 2021, Biden met with Putin in Geneva, Switzerland. The two presidents discussed a number of topics, including stable policy on climate change, nuclear proliferation, and cybersecurity. Russia's activities regarding Ukraine, Alexei Navalny, Belarus, and nationals jailed in each other's countries. The summit was significantly shorter than expected, only lasting three and a half of the predicted five hours. Putin praised Biden as a knowledgeable and shrewd negotiator the next day.

In November 2021, Putin stated that an expansion of NATO's presence in Ukraine, especially the deployment of any long-range missiles capable of striking Russian cities or missile defense systems similar to those in Romania and Poland, would be a "red line" issue for Russia. In December 2021, Putin asked President Joe Biden for legal guarantees that NATO wouldn't expand eastward or put "weapons systems that threaten us in close vicinity to Russian territory." The U.S. and NATO have rejected Putin's demands.

On February 24, 2022, Biden condemned Russia's invasion of Ukraine, saying Putin "chose this war" and calling him "the aggressor". He announced new sanctions against Russia. On February 25, the White House announced the US would personally sanction Putin and foreign minister Sergey Lavrov. On February 28, the Biden administration announced sanctions against Russia's central bank, prohibiting Americans from doing business with the bank and freezing the bank's assets. On March 29, 2022, Biden appeared to heighten his condemnation concerning Putin made at the end of his NATO trip to Europe, stating that he makes "no apologies" for previously stating that "Putin cannot remain in power". On April 12, he called the war a "genocide". Biden criticized the Kremlin for "idle comments" on the possible use of nuclear weapons.

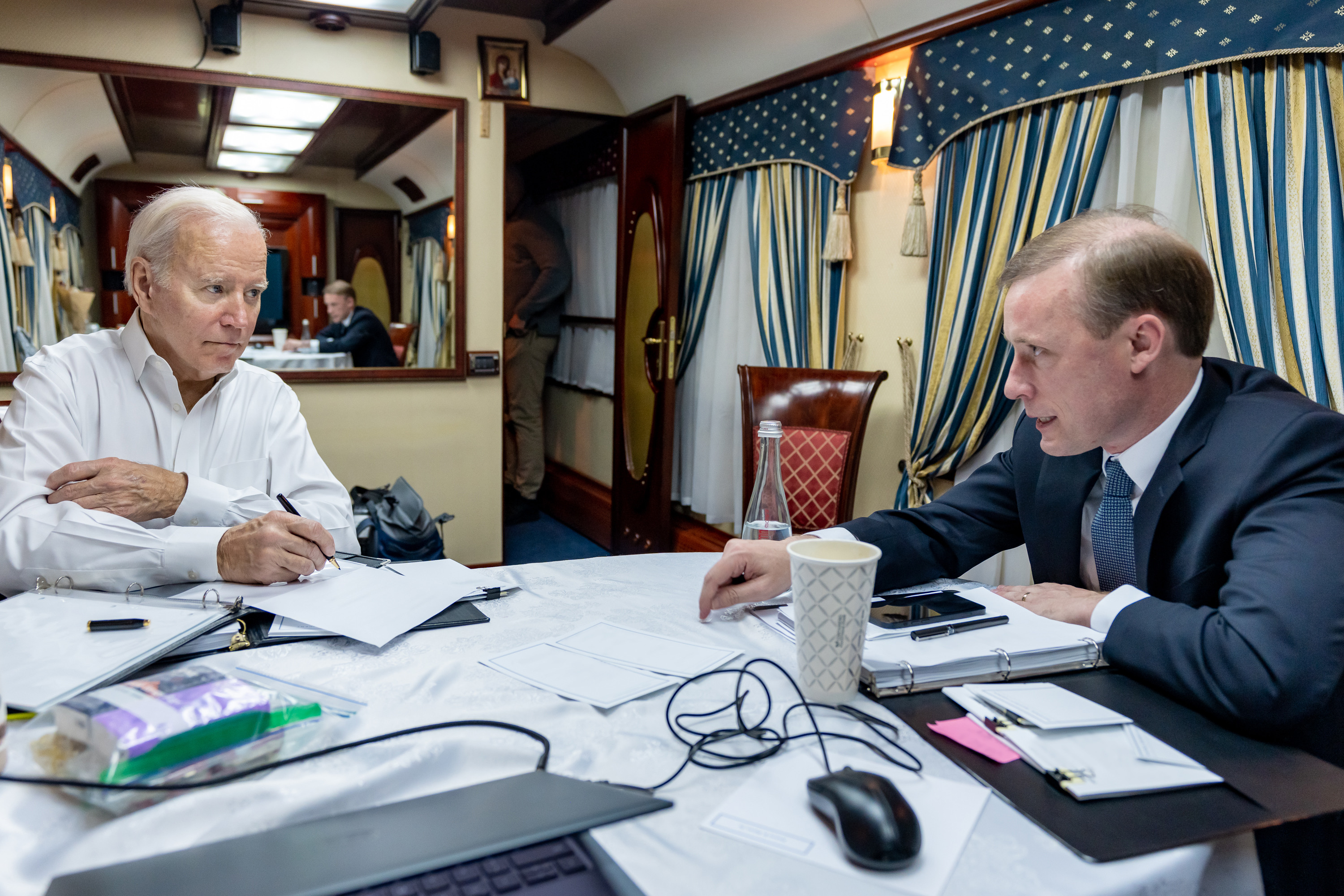
Biden with his National Security Adviser Jake Sullivan, February 19, 2023

On April 28, Biden asked Congress for an additional $33 billion to assist Ukraine, including $20 billion to provide weapons to Ukraine. On May 10, the House passed legislation that would provide $40 billion in new aid to Ukraine. The New York Times reported that the United States provided real-time battlefield targeting intelligence to Ukraine that helped Ukrainian forces kill Russian generals and sink the Russian warship Moskva. The Biden administration has pledged to help the International Criminal Court (ICC) to prosecute Putin and others for war crimes committed during the invasion of Ukraine.

On September 27, 2022, White House press secretary Karine Jean-Pierre encouraged Russian men fleeing their home country to avoid being drafted to apply for asylum in the United States. In early 2023, the Biden administration resumed deportations of Russians who had fled Russia because of mobilization and political persecution.

In January 2024, the Biden administration rejected Putin's proposal for a ceasefire in Ukraine. Biden's National Security Advisor Jake Sullivan informed Putin's foreign policy adviser Yuri Ushakov that the United States would not discuss a ceasefire without Ukraine's participation.

On May 30, 2024, Biden gave Ukraine permission to strike targets inside Russia using American-supplied weapons. Biden said "They are authorized to be used in proximity to the border. We are not authorizing strikes 200 miles into Russia." On August 9, 2024, a convoy of Russian troops in the Kursk Oblast of Russia was destroyed in a strike by U.S.-supplied HIMARS rocket system in what Russian milbloggers described as one of the bloodiest attacks of the entire war.

=== Ukraine ===
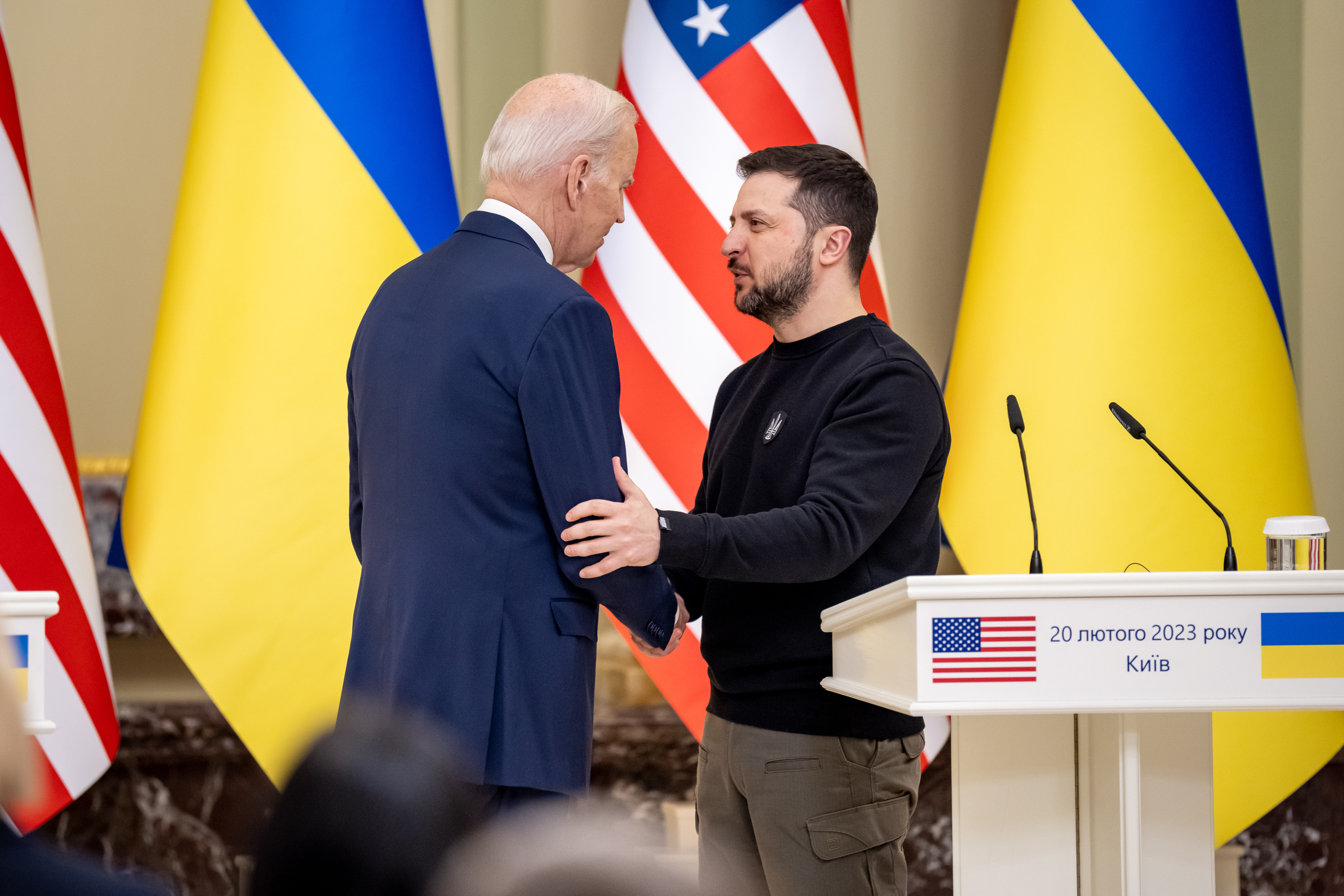
Biden with Ukrainian president Volodymyr Zelenskyy in Kyiv, Ukraine, February 20, 2023

In February 2022, amid rising tensions between Ukraine and Russia, the Biden administration faced questions for its year-long failure to nominate an ambassador to Ukraine.

The Russian invasion of Ukraine instigated significant and substantial support to Ukraine during the Biden presidency including two dozen military aid packages to assist them against the invasion. On October 28, 2022 the Pentagon announced the 24th presidential drawdown of materiel worth $275 million; the security assistance has totaled $18.5 billion to Ukraine since January 2021. The aid includes 500 Excalibur precision-guided 155mm artillery rounds, 2000 155mm remote anti-armor mine systems, more than 1,300 anti-armor weapons, more than 2.75 million rounds of small arms ammunition, more HIMARS rockets, 125 Humvees, and four satellite communications antennas for Ukraine's command and control systems, as well as training for operation of the NASAMS units. (Note: The first NASAMS is coming to Ukraine (October 17, 2022), now that NASAMS training is nearly complete.) Two NASAMS units arrived in Ukraine on November 7, 2022. (Note: As of November 16, 2022, the NASAMS had a 100% kill rate against their targets.)

On February 20, 2023, four days before the one-year anniversary of the start of Russia's invasion of Ukraine, Biden visited Kyiv and met with President Volodymyr Zelenskyy and First Lady of Ukraine Olena Zelenska. While there, Biden affirmed more military aid to Ukraine and denounced the war. The trip was unannounced, and involved major security coordinations to ensure safety.

In 2022, Congress approved more than $112 billion in aid to Ukraine. In October 2023, the Biden administration requested $61.4 billion more in aid for Ukraine for the year ahead.

=== Europe ===
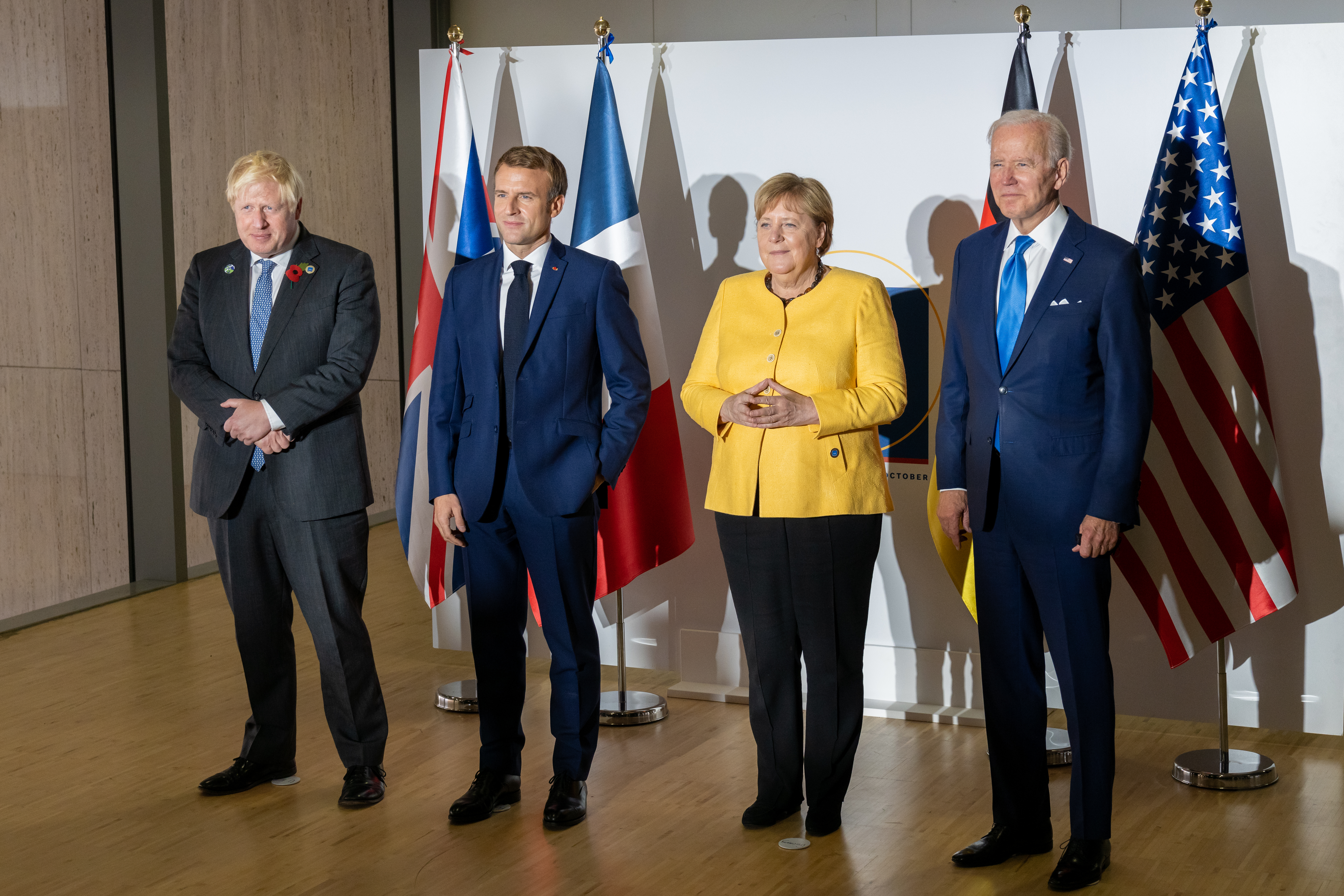
President Biden with European leaders at the G20 summit in Rome, Italy, October 30, 2021

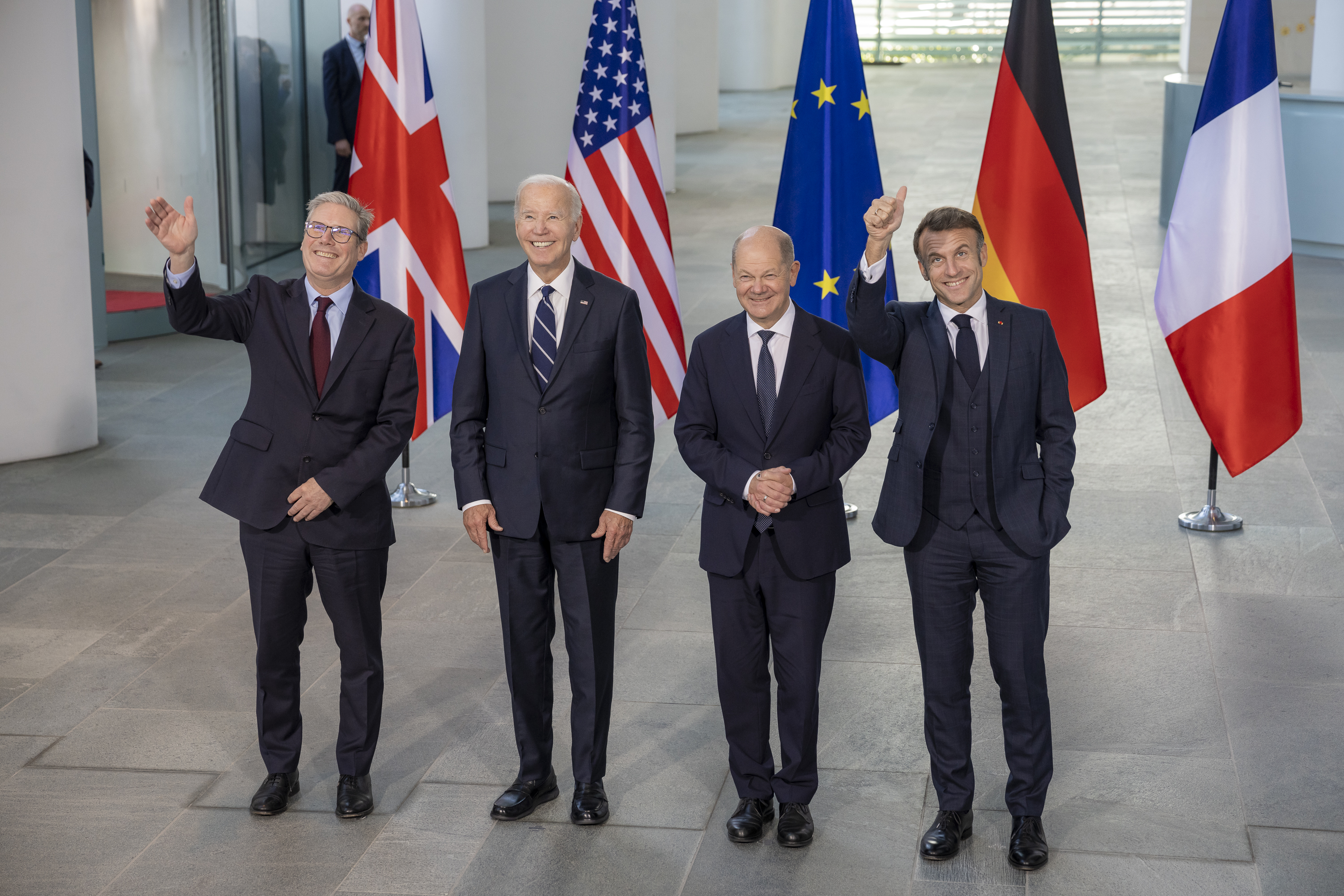
President Biden with European leaders in Berlin, Germany, October 18, 2024

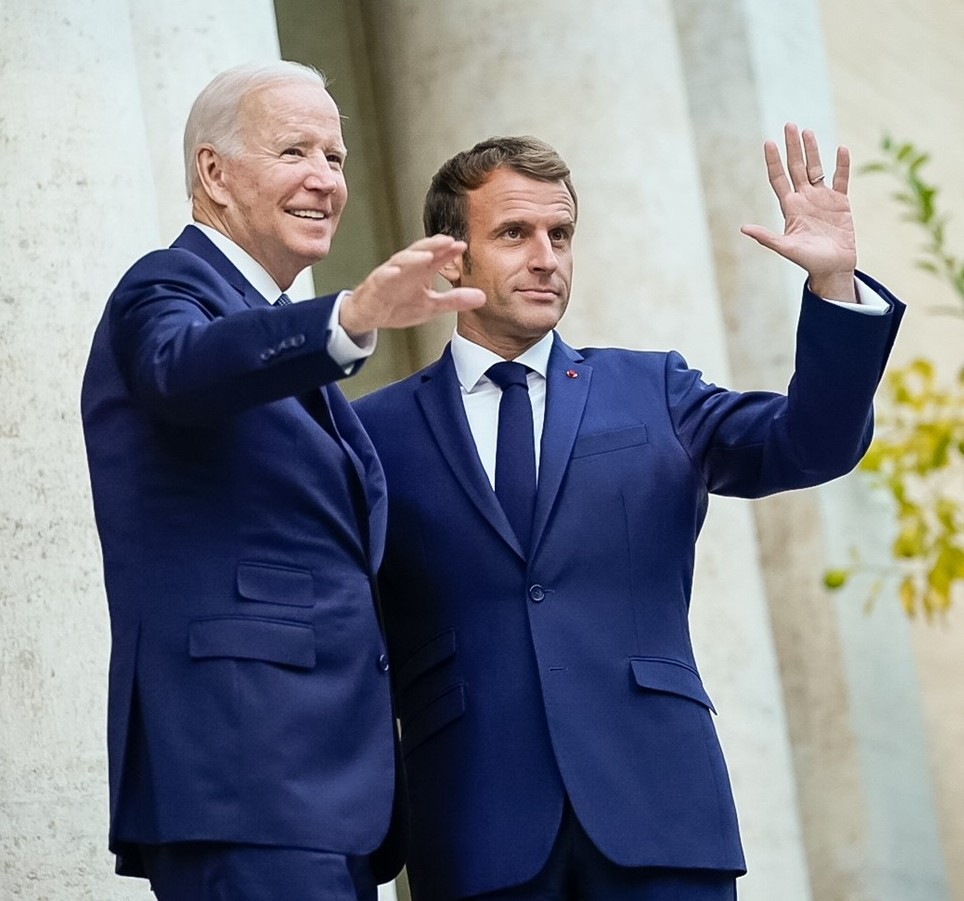
President Biden and French President Macron meeting in Rome, October 29, 2021

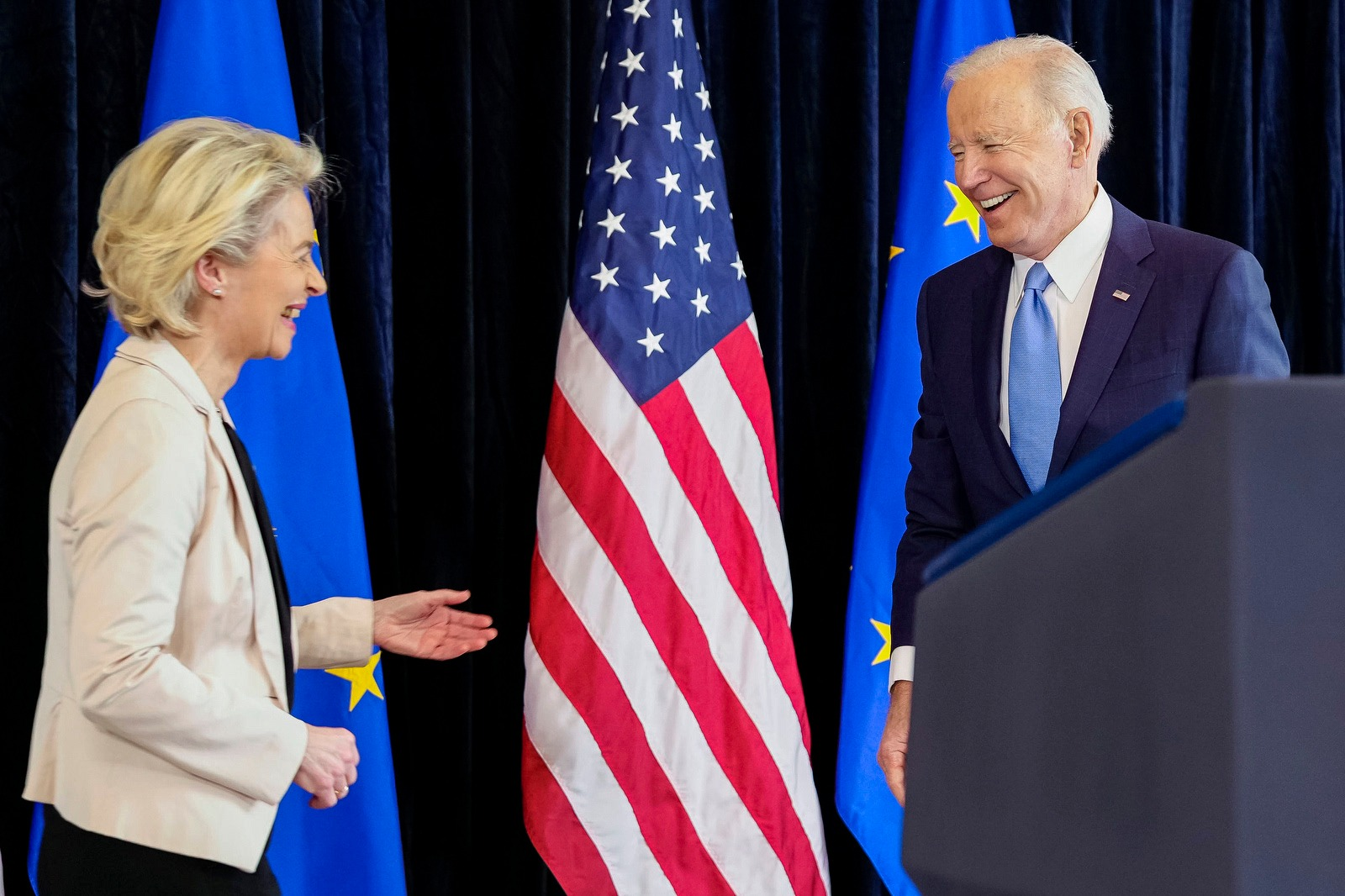
President Biden with European Commission President Ursula von der Leyen at a special meeting with NATO in Brussels, Belgium, March 24, 2022

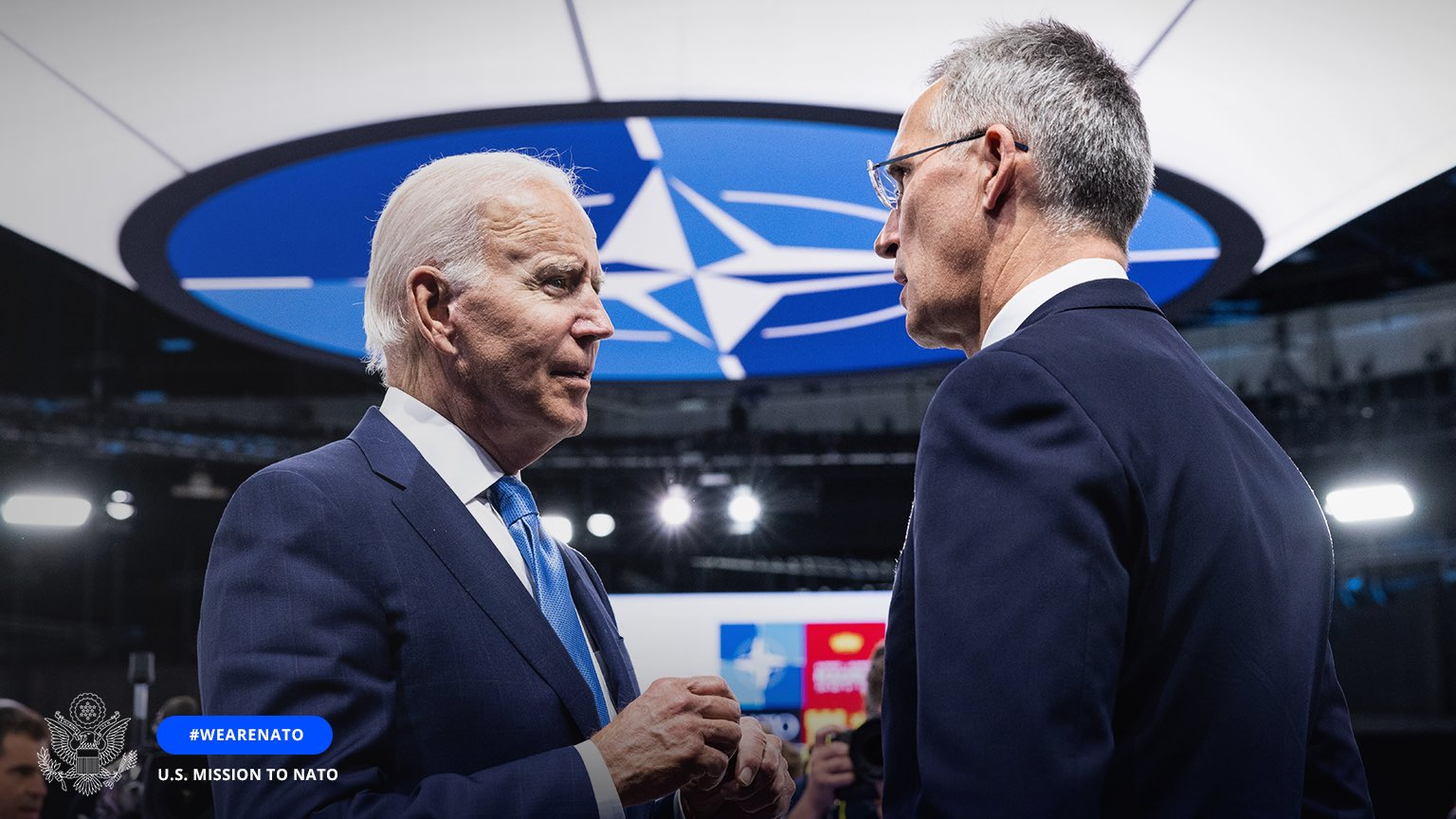
President Biden with NATO Secretary General Jens Stoltenberg at the 2022 NATO Summit in Madrid, Spain, June 29, 2022

President Biden promised to repair "strained" relationships with European allies in contrast to his predecessor Trump. "An attack on one is an attack on all. That is our unshakeable vow," Biden said, referring to Article 5 of the North Atlantic Treaty (the mutual defense clause). Biden pledged support for the European project and for Ukraine's sovereignty as well as the need for global cooperation on fighting the pandemic and climate change.

U.S. relations with France deteriorated in September 2021 due to fallout from the AUKUS security pact between the United States, the United Kingdom, and Australia, which aimed to counter Chinese power in the Indo-Pacific region. As part of the agreement, the U.S. agreed to provide nuclear-powered submarines to Australia. After entering into the agreement, the Australian government canceled an agreement that it had made with France for the provision of French conventionally powered submarines. The deal angered the French government, which recalled its ambassador to the U.S. (Philippe Étienne) as well as the ambassador to Australia. Amid the diplomatic row, the French Foreign Ministry contended that it had been subjected to "duplicity, disdain and lies" and French foreign minister Jean-Yves Le Drian called the deal a "stab in the back". In a conciliatory call a few days later, Biden and French president Emmanuel Macron agreed to reduce bilateral tensions, and the White House acknowledged the crisis could have been averted if there had been open consultations between allies. A month later, Biden met Macron, telling him his administration was "clumsy" and that he was "under the impression that France had been informed long before" that France's deal with Australia was "not going through".

In July 2024, the Biden administration announced its intention to deploy long-range missiles in Germany beginning in 2026. In response, Russian president Putin warned of a Cold War-style missile crisis and threatened to deploy long-range missiles within striking distance of the West. US weapons in Germany would include SM-6 and Tomahawk cruise missiles and hypersonic weapons. The United States' decision to deploy long-range missiles in Germany has been compared to the deployment of Pershing II launchers in Western Europe in 1979. Critics say the move would trigger a new arms race. According to Russian military analysts, it would be extremely difficult to distinguish between a conventionally armed missile and a missile carrying a nuclear warhead, and Russia could respond by deploying longer-range nuclear systems targeting Germany.

Biden has reiterated his commitment to maintaining peace in Northern Ireland by resisting the possibility of a hard border as a result of Brexit.

=== Cuba ===
The Biden administration has maintained the sanctions against Cuba that were issued by the first Trump administration, despite one of Biden's campaign promises being to lift restrictions against the country.

In June 2021, the Biden administration continued America's tradition of voting against an annual United Nations General Assembly resolution calling for an end to the U.S. economic embargo against Cuba. The resolution was adopted for the 29th time with 184 votes in favor, three abstentions, and two no votes: the U.S. and Israel.

In July 2021, protesters gathered in front of the White House and demonstrators called on President Joe Biden to take action in Cuba. The Biden administration sanctioned a key Cuban official and a government special forces unit known as the Boinas Negras for human rights abuses in the wake of historic protests on the island. On July 22, 2021, directly before hosting a meeting with Cuban American leaders, President Biden stated "I unequivocally condemn the mass detentions and sham trials that are unjustly sentencing to prison those who dared to speak out in an effort to intimidate and threaten the Cuban people into silence." President Biden has also ordered government specialists to develop ideas for the U.S. to unilaterally extend internet access on the island, and he has promised to enhance backing for Cuban dissidents.

In August 2021, Biden sanctioned three additional Cuban officials who were also reportedly involved in the suppression of anti-government protesters in Cuba.

In December 2021, 114 Democratic House members signed a letter that urged President Biden to lift restrictions and sanctions against Cuba in order to make their access to food and medicine easier.

In January 2022, Biden again sanctioned Cuba officials, this time placing travel restrictions on eight members of the Cuban government.

In May 2022, the Biden administration lifted some of the sanctions, with policy changes such as expansion of flights to Cuba and resumption of a family reunification program. In January 2023, the Biden administration made changes to its immigration policy, to limit the amount of Cuban migrants entering the United States.

In the final week of his presidency, the Biden administration removed Cuba from the state sponsors of terrorism list, in concert with a prisoner exchange, brokered by the Vatican.

=== Africa ===
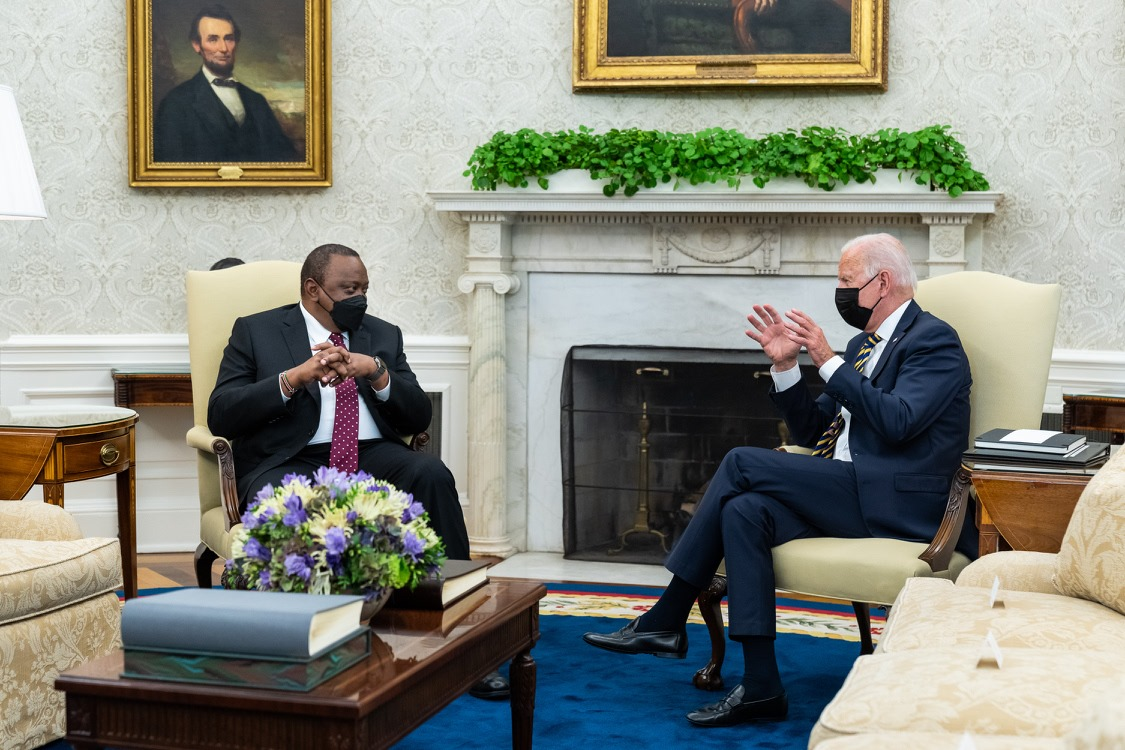
President Biden meeting with Kenyan President Uhuru Kenyatta, October 14, 2021

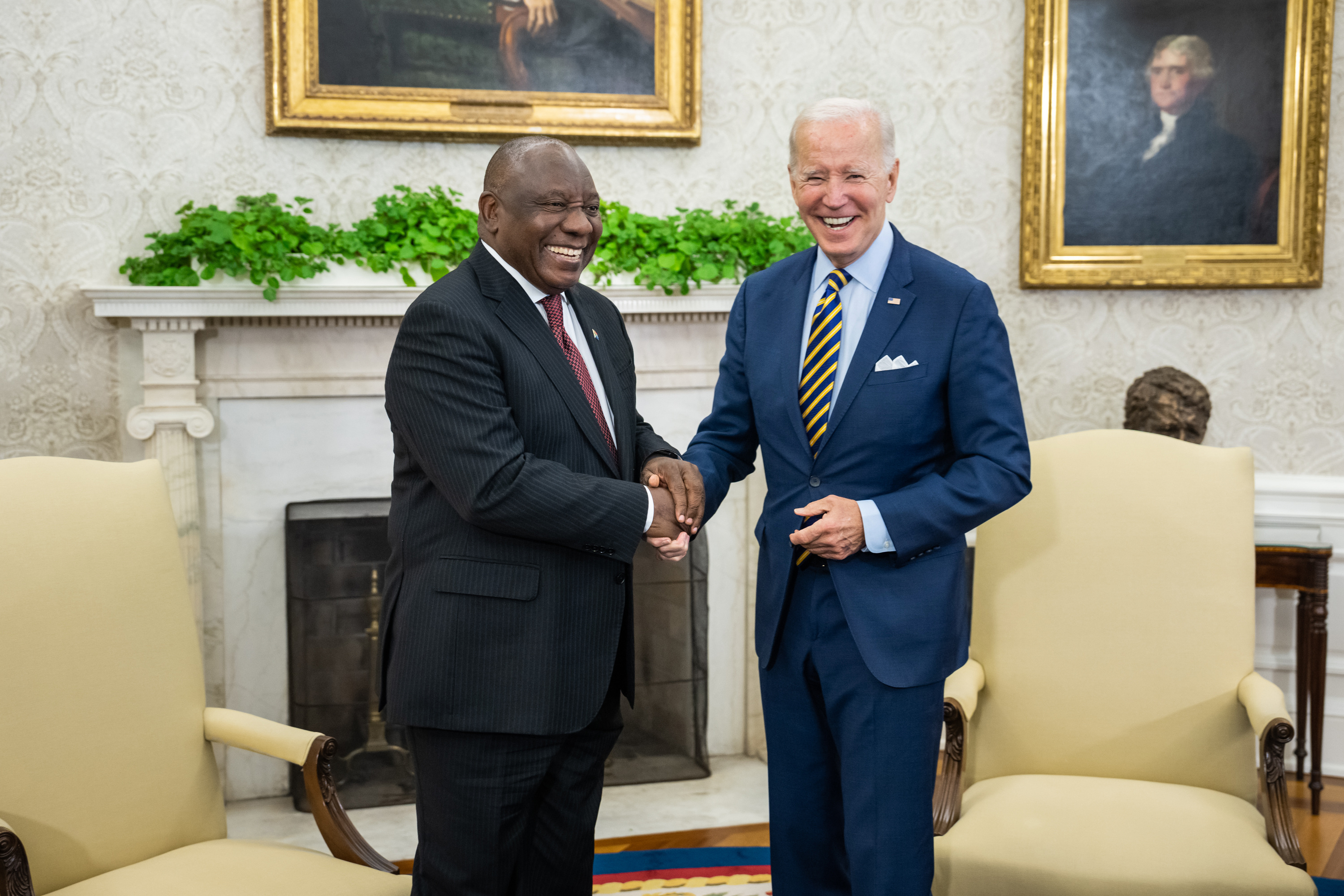
President Biden meeting with South African President Cyril Ramaphosa, September 16, 2022

Biden hosted a three-day U.S.-Africa summit in Washington in December 2022, attended by 49 African national leaders. The meeting was the first such summit since 2014. The leaders of every African nation in good standing with the African Union (AU), except Eritrea, were invited to the summit. The leaders of African nations not in good standing with the AU (mostly those who had come to power through military coups) were also not invited.

At the summit, Biden announced U.S. support for the AU joining the G20 group of major economies, a long-sought goal for Africa. The summit was part of a broader effort by the U.S. to rebuild U.S.-African relations and counter Chinese influence on the continent. During the summit, the administration announced $800 million in new deals with Cisco Systems and Cybastion to combat cyberthreats targeting Africa, a bid to blunt the dominance of the Chinese firm Huawei in Africa. The administration also signed a memorandum of understanding in support of the African Continental Free Trade Area to reduce trade barriers in Africa, and committed $55 billion to Africa over the next three years, focused on preexisting U.S. initiatives, such as the trade-focused Prosper Africa and Africa Growth and Opportunity Act, as well as the Power Africa initiative, which aims to increase connections of Africans to the electric grid. The administration also emphasized initiatives in technology and cybersecurity, health, clean energy and the environment, and other areas. Biden committed an additional $2 billion for emergency humanitarian aid and $11 billion for food security programs in Africa. The administration also expanded ties with West Africa, including support for infrastructure improvements at the Benin seaport of Cotonou, a key part of the West African economy. Biden appointed a longtime U.S. diplomat, Johnnie Carson, to coordinate implementation of U.S. actions following up the summit.

During the 2022 summit, Biden and senior administration officials also met privately with six African leaders facing elections in 2023, pushing them to ensure free and fair elections in their nations.

Senator Bob Menendez, the Democratic chairman of the Senate Foreign Relations Committee, has criticized the Biden administration for hesitating to impose sanctions on the governments of Sudan and Ethiopia, where many atrocities and war crimes were committed in the Tigray War.

=== Americans detained abroad ===
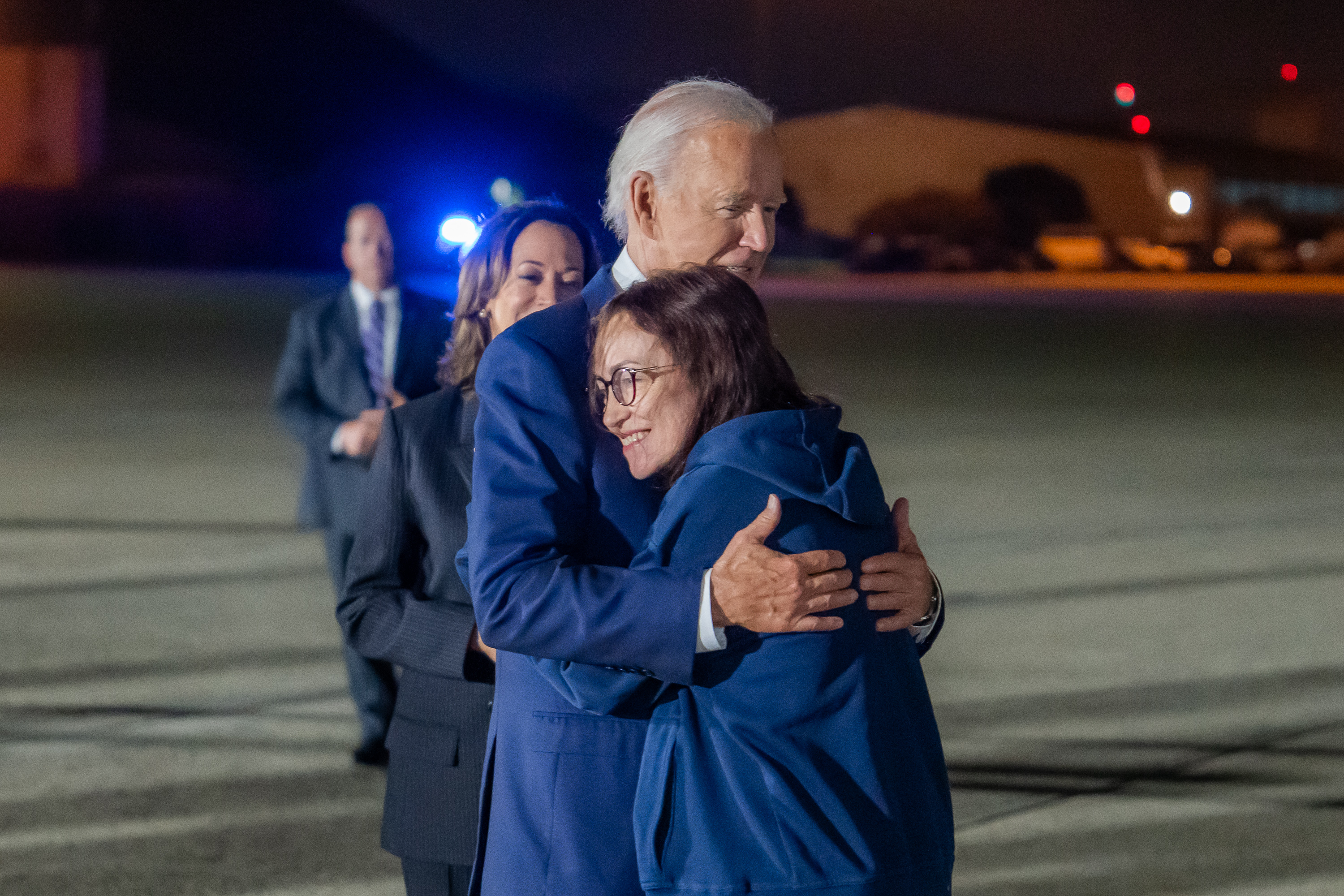
President Biden and Vice President Harris greet Russian American journalist Alsu Kurmasheva on August 1, 2024, after her release in a prisoner swap with Russia.

In July 2022, President Biden signed an executive order aimed at deterring the wrongful detention of Americans abroad. According to an estimate by The James W. Foley Legacy Foundation, there are at least 67 U.S. citizens who are currently imprisoned abroad. The foundation further estimates that 90% of those are wrongly detained by foreign governments hostile to the U.S., including Venezuela, Russia, China, Iran, and others. Dozens of families of Americans who are detained abroad say President Biden has failed to adequately address the crisis. They formed a group called "Bring Our Families Home Campaign" to pressure Biden to do more.

In September 2023, President Biden reached a deal to release five prisoners held by Iran. In exchange, $6 billion of frozen Iranian assets were released. The U.S. said the unfrozen money would be held in restricted accounts so that it could only be spent on humanitarian goods such as food and medicine.

In August 2024, President Biden reached a deal to secure the largest prisoner exchange since the Cold War. The exchange included the release of Americans Evan Gershkovich, Paul Whelan, and Alsu Kurmasheva; thirteen others from Russia and Belarus; and Russians held by the U.S., Slovenia, Norway, Poland, and Germany. Turkey and Estonia were also involved in the deal. Biden stressed the importance of alliances on the world stage by describing the achievement as "a powerful example of why it's vital to have friends in this world."

=== Worldwide LGBT rights ===
On February 4, 2021, Biden issued a presidential memorandum for expanding protection of LGBT rights worldwide, which includes the possibility to impose financial sanctions.

The US State Department released a statement on Intersex Awareness Day promoting LGBTQI+ rights around the globe, saying, "Intersex persons often face stigma and discrimination in accessing education, healthcare, and legal recognition, and are subjected to medically unnecessary surgeries. These harmful practices, which can cause lifelong negative physical and emotional consequences, are a medical form of so-called conversion therapy practices in that they seek to physically "convert" Intersex children into non-Intersex children."

Biden announced he would be removing Uganda from the African Growth and Opportunity Act trade deal over the country's anti-LGBT bill that included the death penalty for "aggravated homosexuality" and life-in-prison for identifying as LGBT.

== Investigations of Biden ==
=== Hur special counsel investigation ===
Biden's attorneys informed the National Archives Administration in November 2022 that classified documents from before Biden's presidency had been found at the Penn Biden Center. Days later Attorney General Garland tasked U.S. Attorney John R. Lausch Jr. with conducting an initial investigation. On January 5, 2023, Lausch advised Garland that the assignment of a special counsel was warranted. On January 12, Garland announced that he was appointing a special counsel to investigate "possible unauthorized removal and retention of classified documents or other records", and appointed Robert K. Hur as special counsel. Hur released his report on February 8, 2024, stating that the "evidence does not establish Mr. Biden's guilt beyond a reasonable doubt". The report's final conclusion was that "no criminal charges are warranted in this matter" and that it would be "the same even if there was no policy against charging a sitting president".

=== Congressional investigations ===
On September 12, 2023, Speaker McCarthy acceded to the right wing of the House Republican Conference and announced the launch of an impeachment inquiry into Biden. McCarthy claimed that earlier findings of House investigations "paint a picture of corruption" involving Biden and his relatives. Prior investigations have failed to find evidence of wrongdoing by the president. (Note: Attributed to multiple sources:) The impeachment inquiry fizzled out by April 2024.

== Elections during the Biden presidency ==
Congressional party leaders
		Senate leaders		House leaders	
Congress	Year	Majority	Minority	Speaker	Minority
117th	2021–2022	Schumer (Note: After two runoff elections, of Democrats Jon Ossoff and Raphael Warnock in Georgia, there were 50 Republicans and 50 Democrats (including 2 independents who caucus with the Democrats) in the Senate. Both Ossoff (Georgia's class 2 seat) and Warnock (Georgia's class 3 seat) were seated on January 20, 2021. With Democratic vice president Kamala Harris casting tie-breaking votes, the Democrats also have held a majority in the Senate from January 20, 2021.)	McConnell	Pelosi	McCarthy
118th	2023	Schumer	McConnell	McCarthy	Jeffries
118th	2023–2024	Schumer	McConnell	Johnson (Note: Kevin McCarthy was removed as Speaker of the House on October 3, 2023. Patrick McHenry acted as Speaker pro tempore from October 3, 2023, to October 25, 2023. Mike Johnson was elected to replace McCarthy as Speaker of the House on October 25, 2023.)	Jeffries
119th (Note: 17 days of the 117th Congress (January 3, 2021 – January 19, 2021) took place under President Trump, with the Republicans also briefly have held a majority in the Senate until January 20, 2021, and 17 days of the 119th Congress (January 3, 2025 – January 19, 2025) took place during Biden's presidency.)	2025	Thune	Schumer	Johnson	Jeffries

Democratic seats in Congress (Note: Democratic seats at the start of each session of Congress. Independents caucusing with the Democratic Party (Senators Bernie Sanders, Angus King, Joe Manchin, and Kyrsten Sinema) are counted as Democrats for the purposes of this table. Throughout Biden's presidency, there were a total of 100 Senate seats in 435 House seats, so a Democratic majority in the Senate required 50 seats (since Democratic vice president Kamala Harris could provide the tie-breaking vote), and a Democratic majority in the House required 218 seats (assuming no vacancies).)
Congress	Senate	House
117th	50	222
118th	51	213
119th	47	215

=== 2022 midterm elections ===
Despite Biden's low approvals, a red wave did not occur during the 2022 mid-term elections as many had anticipated. Democrats expanded their narrow Senate majority while Republicans took control of the House by a far smaller margin than expected. This was largely attributed to a backlash against the Supreme Court's decision in Dobbs v. Jackson Women's Health Organization, as well as the perceived extremeness of certain Republican candidates in competitive races.

It was the first midterm election since 1986 in which the party of the incumbent president achieved a net gain in governorships, and the first since 1934 in which the president's party didn't lose any state legislative chambers or incumbent senators.

Many pundits had failed to predict the Democrats' resilient performance; Simon Rosenberg was one exception. Polls for the election cycle were the most accurate since 1998, though Republican-aligned pollsters such as the Trafalgar Group had a notable polling miss.

The results drew praise from the Democratic Party, and Biden celebrated the results as a strong day for democracy.

Democratic overperformance in these elections are considered to have played a factor in the party's defeat in the 2024 elections, with its results misinterpreted as support for Biden's initial bid for re-election.

After the election, Kevin McCarthy replaced Nancy Pelosi as Speaker of the House, while Hakeem Jeffries became the House Minority Leader.

=== 2024 elections and transition period ===
==== Initial re-election campaign and withdrawal ====
President Biden's announcement that he would not run for re-election

After speculation Biden would not seek re-election due to his advanced age and poor job approval, Biden officially announced his reelection campaign for the Democratic nomination in the 2024 presidential election on April 25, 2023. Representative Dean Phillips ran against Biden in the primaries but was unsuccessful. Phillips campaigned as a younger alternative to Biden, who would be a stronger opponent to Trump. Biden became the presumptive Democratic party nominee on March 12, 2024, facing no effective challengers in the primaries. Following what was widely viewed as a lackluster performance in the first presidential debate against presumptive Republican nominee Donald Trump and numerous age and health concerns, Biden faced repeated calls to suspend his candidacy. On July 21, 2024, Biden announced in a post on X (formerly known as Twitter) that he was suspending his campaign. He stated that "while it has been my intention to seek re-election, I believe it is in the best interest of my party and the country for me to stand down and to focus solely on fulfilling my duties as President for the remainder of my term", and immediately endorsed Vice President Kamala Harris to replace him in his place as the party's presidential nominee.

==== General election and transition period ====
Republican Donald Trump defeated Democrat Kamala Harris in the 2024 presidential election.

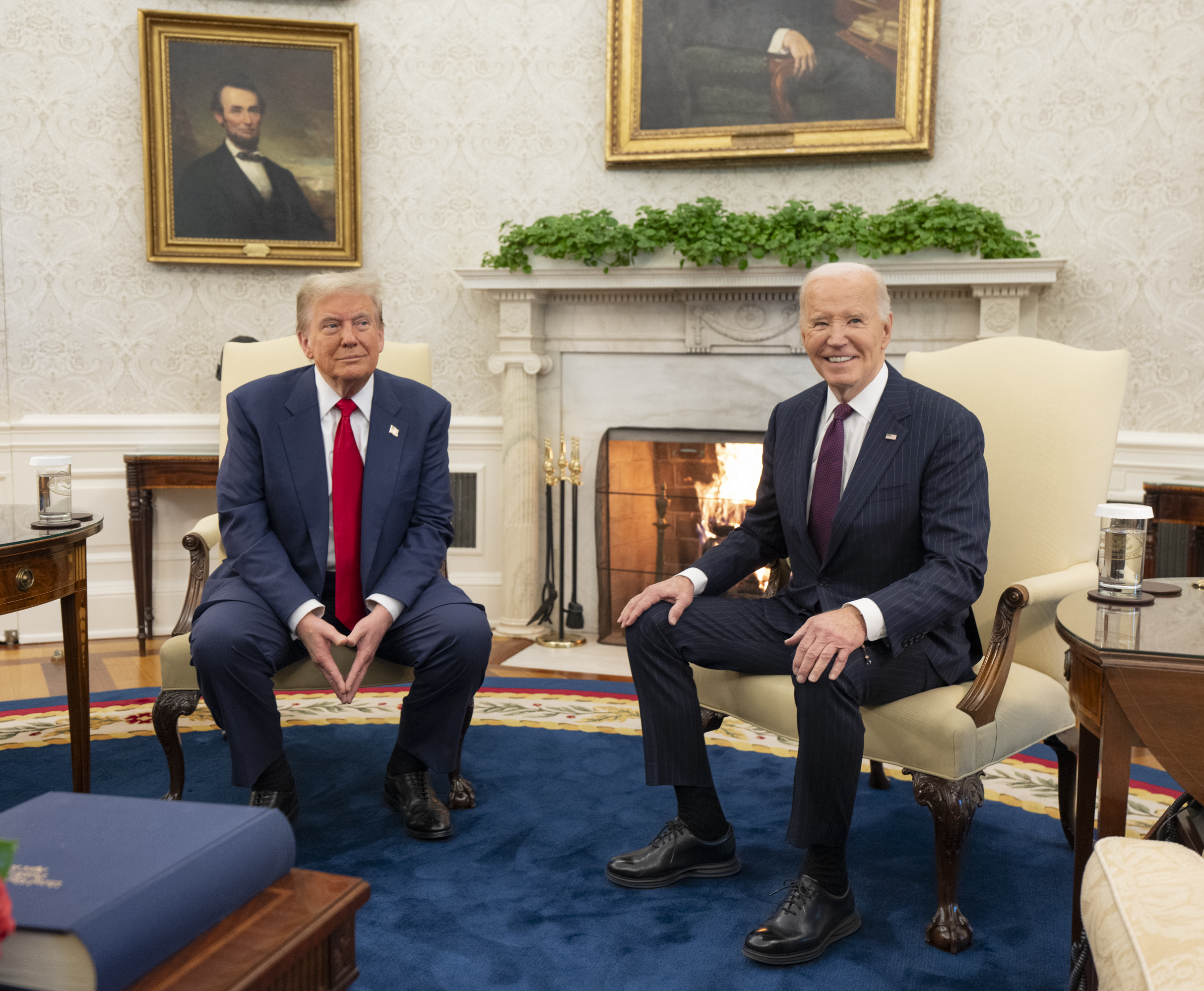
Outgoing president Joe Biden and President-elect Donald Trump in the Oval Office on November 13, 2024

President Biden's farewell address on January 15, 2025

Following the attempted assassination of his then-opponent and then-presumptive Republican nominee former president Donald Trump, Biden condemned the shooting and, in an Oval Office address the next day, spoke about the "need for to lower the temperature" of its political rhetoric.

Biden defended his record as president at the Democratic National Convention and advocated for the election of Harris in one of the last speeches of his presidency. The convention was largely portrayed as an honoring of his political legacy. In the general election, Harris was defeated by Trump. Some Democrats attributed Harris' loss to Biden's unpopularity on issues such as the economy and his refusal to withdraw from the race sooner. In the concurrent congressional elections, Republicans also retained a narrow majority in the House of Representatives and took control of the Senate.

On January 15, 2025, Biden gave a farewell address in the Oval Office days before the second inauguration of Donald Trump.

== Approval ratings and image ==
Very early in Biden's presidency, opinion polls found that Biden's approval ratings were steadier than Trump's, with an average approval rating of 55% and an average disapproval rate of 39%. Biden's early approval ratings have been more polarized than Trump's, with 98% of Democrats, 61% of independents and 11% of Republicans approving of Biden's presidency in February 2021, a party gap of 87%. Around the end of his first hundred days in office, Biden's approval rating was higher than Trump's but was the third worst since the presidency of Harry Truman; only Trump and Gerald Ford scored lower.

After the fall of Kabul and the surge of COVID-19 cases due to the Delta variant in July and August 2021, Biden's approval rating began to steadily decline, from a high of 52.7% approval on July 26, 2021, to 45.9% approval by September 3, 2021, according to FiveThirtyEight. While the White House emphasized COVID-19 as causing his low approval rating, inflation, the highest in nearly 40 years, has also been described as a cause. Biden's lowest approval rating on record comes from a Quinnipiac University poll in July 2022, which showed just 31% of respondents approving of his performance as president.

By the one-year anniversary of Biden's presidency on January 20, 2022, Gallup recorded the average approval rating for Biden's first year as 49%, which was the second-lowest first-year average approval rating for any American president since World War II; only Trump's first-year average of 38.4% was lower. Gallup further noted that there was greater political polarization in Biden's approval ratings than any other first-year president in modern history, with 91% of Democrats supporting Biden while just 8% of Republicans supported him, resulting in a party gap of 83%. The only other year of any presidency that saw greater polarization was Trump's final year in office. The July 2022 Gallup survey saw Biden's sixth quarter approval rating of 40%, the lowest sixth quarter rating of any president in modern history dating back to Dwight Eisenhower. Until April 23, according to figures compiled by FiveThirtyEight, Biden's approval rating stood at 42.3 percent, a slight improvement from the sub-40 percent level reached in the summer of 2022, but still well below the peak of 53 percent when he began his presidency in January 2021.

An October 30, 2023, poll by the Arab American Institute, support for Biden among Arab Americans dropped from 59% in 2020 to 17%. The drop in support has been attributed to the administration's handling of the Gaza war.

According to Gallup, in July 2024, Biden's approval rating dropped to 36%, the lowest of his presidency, prior to his decision to end his re-election campaign; his highest approval rating dated back to 57% in April 2021.

== Media appearances ==
Biden was interviewed for several news outlets and appeared on several late-night talk shows throughout his presidency.

In December 2021, Biden appeared on The Tonight Show Starring Jimmy Fallon where they discussed "his Build Back Better Plan, the importance of his bipartisan friendship with the late Sen. Bob Dole, rejecting extremism and getting Americans vaccinated against COVID-19."

In June 2022, Biden appeared on Jimmy Kimmel Live! where he discussed "27 school shootings in America in 2022, why he believes nothing has been done so far about gun violence, an overwhelming amount of Americans supporting background checks, meeting with families after the tragic events in Uvalde, Texas, the idea of passing an Executive Order, the strides made in regard to Climate Change, Joe Manchin & Kyrsten Sinema's voting record, housing, food and gas prices being very high and what he intends to do about inflation, the negative impact that the pandemic has had on families and the need for mental health care, being optimistic about this generation of young people, changes in the press, his process for flushing documents down the toilets, what his intentions are if Roe v Wade does in fact get overturned, and his hopes for America."

In July 2022, comedian and host of The Late Late Show, James Corden, visited the White House and spoke with Biden, Jen Psaki, and White House custodian staff. He also gave a fake press briefing in the James S. Brady Press Briefing Room.

Biden has also been interviewed by Drew Barrymore, Jake Tapper, Jonathan Capehart, Yonit Levi, George Stephanopoulos, David Muir, Scott Pelley, Lester Holt, and Norah O'Donnell, for The Drew Barrymore Show, CNN, MSNBC, Channel 12 in Israel, ABC News, 60 Minutes, NBC, and CBS News, as well as a solo interview by Heather Cox Richardson and Brian Tyler Cohen. Notably, Biden has not sat down with Fox News, despite its popularity in the United States.

News outlets have criticized Biden for only doing a limited amount of interviews during his tenure. Biden participated in 23 interviews in his first 100 days, compared to 95 for Donald Trump (first term), 187 for Barack Obama, 60 for George W. Bush, 64 for Bill Clinton, 70 for George H. W. Bush, and 78 for Ronald Reagan.

== See also ==
- Electoral history of Joe Biden
- Vice presidency of Joe Biden
- Political positions of Joe Biden
