= List of 2021 United States cannabis reform proposals =

- 2020 ← → 2022
- Legality of cannabis in the United States (2023)
- Status: Legal for recreational use Legal for medical use Illegal

The year 2021 started with varying degrees of legalization for unrestricted-THC content cannabis in 34 states, or over half of U.S. states, and continued federal prohibition except for low-THC hemp. Several states considered candidates for 2021 legislation to legalize cannabis for adult use included Connecticut, New Mexico, New York, Pennsylvania, Rhode Island, Texas, and Virginia, some of which like New York had already decriminalized. At the federal level, the Democratic Party's majority in both houses of the 117th United States Congress was cited by Politico as a likely precondition for federal legalization in 2021, with the SAFE Banking Act likely to pass.

== Legislation and initiatives introduced in 2020 for 2021 sessions ==
- Maryland legalization HB0032 was introduced by Jazz Lewis in December 2020 for the 2021 legislative session.
- A Missouri legalization bill was pre-filed in December 2020 by Republican state legislator Shamed Dogan.
- A "justice roadmap" published by New York state Republican lawmakers in late December 2020 included legalization.
- Two Texas legalization bills were introduced in November 2020: SB 140 by Senator Roland Gutierrez, and HB 447 by Representative Joe Moody.

=== Legislation passed in 2020 pending governor's action in 2021 ===
- NJ A21 (20R), a legalization and regulation bill, and NJ A1897 (20R), decriminalization, were sent to the governor on December 17. New Jersey governor Phil Murphy said he would conditionally veto the bills if language on underage possession was not reconciled by January 30.

== Legislation and initiatives introduced in 2021 ==
=== State ===
State	Title	Type	Date introduced	Short description	Detail
Alabama (main)	SB46	Law	January 29, 2021	Medical	On January 29, Alabama SB46, the Alabama Compassion Act for legalization of (non-smokeable) medical cannabis, was reintroduced by state senator Tim Melson (R), who is also a physician. The bill was passed by the Alabama Senate on February 24, and by the House on May 6. It was signed into law by the governor on May 17.
Connecticut (main)	HB 6377	Bill	February 4, 2021	Legalization	On February 4, Connecticut House Bill 6377 – co-written by committee chairs representative Robyn Porter and senator Julie Kushner – was introduced in the Labor and Public Employees Committee, to allow home cultivation and establish a state Cannabis Control Commission. The bill was advanced by the House Labor and Public Employees Committee on March 25.
Connecticut (main)	SB888	Bill	February 11, 2021	Legalization	Senate Bill 888, introduced at the governor's request and referred to the Joint Judiciary Committee on February 11, would legalize cannabis. It was tabled for the Senate calendar on June 1.
Connecticut (main)	SB 1118	Bill	June 5, 2021	Legalization	Approved by the Senate on June 8. The regular session ended on June 9 without a house vote.
Connecticut (main)	SB 1201	Law	June 15, 2021	Legalization	Introduced during the special session, and passed by state senate on the first day, June 15. It was amended and passed by the house the next day, and the amended bill was approved by the senate on June 17. The state held a ceremony on June 22 in which the bill received the governor's ratification and became law.
Delaware	HB150	Bill	March 18, 2021	Legalization	Announced by Rep. Edward Osienski on February 13 and introduced as HB150, Delaware Marijuana Control Act, on March 18. Osienski was sponsor of Delaware HB110 in prior session.
Florida	HB 343 and SB 710	Bills	January 21, 2021	Legalization	On January 21, Florida HB 343 and SB 710, corresponding legalization bills, were announced by their sponsors Representative Carlos Guillermo Smith (D) and Senator Jeff Brandes (R).
Florida	House Bill 1215	Bill	February 26, 2021	Decriminalization	
Georgia (main)	SB195	Law	February 16, 2021	Medical	Up to 30 dispensaries may operate beginning July 1, 2021.
Hawaii	SB767	Bill	January 11, 2021	Legalization	On January 11, Hawaii SB767 was introduced to legalize cannabis for adult personal use, possession, and sale. It was advanced by the Senate Committee on Public Safety, Intergovernmental and Military Affairs on February 16, along with a bill raising existing limits for possession under state decriminalization. On March 3, it was advanced by the Judiciary Committee for a Senate floor vote. On March 9, the senate passed the bill.
Idaho (main)	SB1017	Law	January 20, 2021	Adjusts Legal CBD	On January 20, Idaho SB1017 was introduced to raise the allowable THC level in legal cannabidiol (CBD) products from 0% to 0.1% THC. The bill was signed into law on February 26, 2021. Effective July 1, 2021.
Idaho (main)	Idaho Medical Marijuana Act	Initiative	February 11, 2021	Medical	On February 11, the Idaho Secretary of State approved the Idaho Medical Marijuana Act initiative for signature collection.
Idaho (main)	Personal Adult Marijuana Decriminalization Act	Initiative	July 9, 2021	Decriminalization	Decriminalizes up to three ounces of cannabis legally purchased (outside of Idaho).
Indiana	HB1028	Bills	February 16, 2021	Decriminalization	
Indiana	HB1070	Bill	December 31, 2021	Decriminalization	Pre-filed for 2022 session
Indiana	HB1049	Bill	December 31, 2021	Regulation	Pre-filed for 2022 session by representatives Sue Errington and Chris Campbell. Establishes Cannabis Compliance Commission and Cannabis Compliance Advisory Committee.
Iowa	SF406	Bill	February 18, 2021	Legalization	Introduced on February 18 by Senator Joe Bolkcom and others, the legislation filed under Senate File 406 would legalize cannabis for 21-and-over adults, and provide for taxation and regulation by Iowa Alcoholic Beverages Division.
Kansas		Bill	January 28, 2021	Medical	On January 28, Kansas Senate Bill 92 was introduced by the Senate Commerce Committee. It would establish the Kansas medical cannabis agency within the Kansas Department of Health and Environment and permit prescription and use of medical cannabis. On May 6 the bill cleared the house in a 79–42 vote and moved to the senate.
Kentucky	HB 136	Bill	January 8, 2021	Medical	On January 8, Kentucky state representative Jason Nemes (R) introduced House Bill 136, legislation that would legalize medical cannabis in the state.
Kentucky	HB467	Bill	February 10, 2021	Legalization	
Kentucky		Bill	November 29, 2021	Legalization	Pre-filed by Rep. Nima Kulkarni
Louisiana (main)	HB 699	Bill	January 1, 2021 (as HB524)	Legalization	"The first legalization instrument to reach the full [Louisiana] House for debate" was tabled following 47–48 vote May 18 on a related cannabis tax bill.
Louisiana (main)	HB 652	Law	April 2, 2021	Decriminalization	A bill to remove jail time and limit fines for possession passed the house on May 11. On June 7, it was approved by a Senate floor vote, and the state governor signed it into law on June 15.
Louisiana (main)	HB391	Law	April 1, 2021	Medical (expansion)	Allows prescription of smokable form. Passed by Senate on May 27, with technical amendments, following House passage. The House acceded to the amendments on June 1, making the bill eligible to be signed into law by the state governor.
Maryland	HB32 and SB708	Bills	February 5, 2021	Legalization	Maryland legalization bills HB32 and SB708 were introduced by the first week of February. They differ in the amount of cannabis that can be legally possessed – two ounces in the house bill, four ounces in the senate bill, sponsored by Senate President Bill Ferguson.
Maryland	HB 1 (2022)	Referendum	December 26, 2021 (bill prefiled)	Legalization	On July 16, the speaker of the state House of Delegates, Adrienne A. Jones, created a committee to draft a referendum on legalization to place before voters in 2022. Around December 25, the chairman of the state House Cannabis Referendum and Legalization Workgroup, Luke Clippinger, pre-filed House Bill 1 for the 2022 session, to initiate the citizen referendum in 2022 that would create a constitutional amendment to legalize cannabis.
Minnesota (main)	HF 600	Bill	February 1, 2021	Legalization	On February 1, Minnesota House Majority Leader Ryan Winkler (DFL) and Speaker of the House Melissa Hortman (DFL) introduced legalization bill HF 600. The bill was passed the House of Representatives on May 13.
Minnesota (main)	HF2128 (omnibus)	Law	February 8, 2021 (as HF907)	Medical (expansion)	Approved by House and Senate. Signed into law by governor May 25.
Missouri	Missouri Marijuana Legalization and Automatic Expungement Initiative	Initiative	March 3, 2020	Legalization	Qualified for signature gathering on May 5, 2021.
Missouri	Fair Access Missouri initiatives	Initiative	Circa July 16	Legalization	Filed with Secretary of State circa July 16
Montana (main)	HB701	Law	May 12, 2021	Legalization	Amends and implements 2020 Montana Initiative 190; signed into law May 19. Taxed and regulated adult use cannabis sales may begin on January 1, 2022.
Nebraska	LR2CA	Constitutional amendment	January 6, 2021	Legalization	On January 6, Nebraska state senator Justin Wayne (D) proposed LR2CA, a constitutional amendment to legalize adult use of cannabis.
Nebraska	LB 474	Bill		Medical	The legislature is scheduled debate the bill on May 12.
Nevada	AB341	Law	March 19, 2021		Legalizes public cannabis consumption lounges for adults not earlier than October 1, 2021.
New Jersey (main)	A5342; S3454	Law	January 29, 2021	Legalization	Further information: Cannabis in New Jersey § 2020 and 2021 legislation On January 29, New Jersey A5342 was introduced in committee to address underage penalties in the legalization and decriminalization bills passed in 2020, which had led to threat of veto (see #Legislation passed in 2020 pending governor's action in 2021). Clean-up bill S3454 was introduced on February 11 after the governor's veto threat and signed into law by the state governor later the same day, along with the earlier legislation on decriminalization and legalization.
New Mexico (main)	HB17 and others	Bills	February 1, 2021	Legalization	On February 1, two New Mexico legalization bills were introduced by Senator Cliff Pirtle (R) and by Senator Daniel Ivey-Soto (D), As of February 13, five different bills had been introduced in the legislature, including HB 12 and HB 17 under consideration by the House Health and Human Services Committee.
New Mexico (main)	HB 12	Law	February 2, 2021	Legalization	On February 2, New Mexico HB 12, the "Cannabis Regulation Act", was introduced by state representative Javier Martinez (D), with provisions for legalization and regulated sales, and expungement. The House Health and Human Services Committee advanced a substitute HB 12 on February 15, and the Taxation & Revenue Committee (chaired by Martinez) advanced the bill on February 24 for a vote on the House floor. On February 26, the House approved the bill 39–31. On March 17, the Senate Judiciary Committee advanced it for a floor vote. On March 26, the state governor called a special session to get a Senate vote on the bill; the House and Senate passed the bill on March 31, and it was signed into law by Governor Lujan Grisham on April 12.
New York (main)	A1248 and S854	Law	January 6, 2021	Legalization	Further information: Marijuana Regulation and Taxation Act Law passed by the New York state legislature on March 30 and signed by the governor March 31.
New York (main)	A3009 and S2509	Bills	January 19, 2021	Legalization	Further information: New York Cannabis Regulation and Taxation Act The revenue bills embodying Governor Andrew Cuomo's budget proposal, A3009 and S2509, contain the Cannabis Regulation and Taxation Act, which would create the Office of Cannabis Management (OCM), a licensing regime with social equity provisions, and would legalize cannabis for adult use.
North Carolina	Senate Bill 669	Bill	April 7, 2021	Medical	
North Carolina	Senate Bill 646	Bill	April 7, 2021	Legalization	
North Carolina	HB 617	Bill	April 20, 2021	Legalization	
North Carolina	SB 711 "NC Compassionate Care Act"	Bill	April 7, 2021	Medical	Would allow cannabis prescriptions for cancer, epilepsy, glaucoma, PTSD, sickle cell anemia, HIV/AIDS, Crohn's disease, Parkinson's disease, ALS or Lou Gehrig's disease, multiple sclerosis, wasting syndrome, severe nausea and "other debilitating medical conditions of the same kind or class". Passed Senate committee on June 30.
North Dakota	HB 1420	Bill	January 21, 2021	Legalization	On January 21, North Dakota HB 1420 was introduced – a legalization and regulation bill for adult use and sponsored by Jason Dockter (R) and co-sponsored by several other Republicans. It was advanced by the Human Services Committee on February 17. The House passed the bill on February 23.
North Dakota	North Dakota Legalize Marijuana and Allow Home Growth Initiative	Initiative	January 22, 2021	Legalization	On January 22, the North Dakota Secretary of State approved signature gathering on an initiated constitutional amendment to legalize cannabis, the North Dakota Legalize Marijuana and Allow Home Growth Initiative, which could appear on the November 2022 ballot.
Ohio		Bill	July 15, 2021	Legalization	Allows adults to possess up to five ounces of cannabis.
Ohio	Regulate Cannabis Like Alcohol initiative	Initiative	July 27, 2021	Legalization	Over 200,000 signatures submitted to state on December 20. On January 3, 2022, the initiative petition was found to have not met the threshold of valid signatures.
Ohio	Pending bill number	Bill	July 30, 2021	Legalization	Introduced by Reps. Weinstein and Upchurch
Ohio	HB 498 Ohio Adult Use Act	Bill	October 12, 2021	Legalization	Tax-and-regulate bill announced by Rep. Jamie Callender (R) in October, formally entered on December 2 with cosponsor Ron Ferguson (R)
Ohio	SB 261	Bill	December 15, 2021	Medical	Does not require any specific conditions. Passed by Senate on December 15.
Pennsylvania	Senate Bill 473	Bill	February 24, 2021	Legalization	Sponsored by Senator Dan Laughlin (R): adult use legalization, expungement, regulation under Pennsylvania Cannabis Regulatory Control Board, and replace Department of Health's Medical Marijuana Program. Referred to Law and Justice committee on October 18.
Pennsylvania	Unnamed	Bill		Legalization	Announced by Representative Wheatley and Representative Frankel on June 21
Pennsylvania	House Bill 1024	Law		Medical (expansion)	Signed by state governor on June 30. "[P]rotects patient safety standards and product quality of Pennsylvania's medical marijuana program while empowering the Medical Marijuana Advisory Board to continue to consider new medical conditions for eligibility". Allows curbside pick-up and allows dispensing three month supply of product.
Pennsylvania	HB 2050	Bill	September 28, 2021	Legalization	
Rhode Island	Senate Bill 568	Bill	January 1, 2021	Legalization	Bill introduced by state Senate Majority Leader Michael McCaffrey and state senator Joshua Miller. Allows sales by April 2022 and regulation under new Rhode Island Cannabis Control Commission. On June 14, the bill was approved by the Senate Judiciary Committee. It was the first time a legalization measure was cleared for a floor vote in either chamber of the Rhode Island legislature. The bill was passed by the senate in a 29–9 vote on June 22.
Rhode Island	H6370	Bill	May 28, 2021	Legalization	Introduced by Rep. Scott A. Slater
South Carolina	H. 3361 / S. 150	Bills	January 12, 2021	Medical	The South Carolina Compassionate Care Act (H. 3361 / S. 150) was filed on January 12. Primary sponsors were Rep. Bill Herbkersman and Sen. Tom Davis, both Republicans. The 2021 legislative session ended in May without a vote on the act.
South Dakota	Adult use act	Bill	October 18, 2021	Legalization	Introduced by Republican representative Hugh Bartels; draft 62 cleared Adult-Use Marijuana Study Subcommittee on October 18
Tennessee	HB 413	Bill	January 2021	Decriminalization	
Tennessee	HB 0621 / SB0854	Bills	March 3, 2021	Medical	
Tennessee	HB 1634	Bill	July 14, 2021	Legalization	Introduced by Rep. Bruce Griffey (R)
Tennessee	SB0118	Law	January 13, 2021	Medical (expansion)	Signed by governor on May 27.
Texas	SB 140	Bill	November 10, 2020	Legalization	
Texas	HB 99	Bill	November 9, 2020	Decriminalization	Public hearings held on April 6.
Texas	HB 441	Bill	November 10, 2020	Decriminalization	Passed the house on April 30 in an 88–40 vote.
Texas	HB 1535	Law	March 8, 2021	Medical	Adds qualifying conditions including PTSD, and raises THC limit. The house passed the bill in a 134–12 vote on April 29; the Senate passed the bill on May 25; and on June 15, the state governor signed the bill.
Texas	HB 2593	Bill		Reduced penalties for concentrates	
Virginia (main)	SB 1406 and HB 2312	Law	January 22, 2021	Legalization	Further information: Cannabis in Virginia § 2021 legalization bills The bill passed by the State Assembly on February 27 will allow the first legal retail sales on January 1, 2024. Governor Ralph Northam amended the bill to authorize legalization for July 2021.
Washington	HB 1019	Bill	January 22, 2021	Home grow	On January 22, Washington HB 1019, allowing home grown cannabis for non-medical use, was advanced by the House Commerce and Gaming Committee.
Wisconsin	AB68	Bill	February 16, 2021	Legalization	2021–2023 biennial budget proposal by state governor Tony Evers (bill AB68) included legalization. Permitting would be provided by Department of Agriculture, Trade and Consumer Protection or by Department of Revenue.
Wisconsin		Bill	August 10, 2021	Legalization	Adult-use legalization, taxation, and regulation bill introduced by state senator Melissa Agard on August 10.
Wisconsin		Bill	November 16, 2021	Decriminalization	$100 fine for quantities under 14 grams. Proposed by representatives Shae Sortwell and Sylvia Ortiz-Velez.
Wyoming	HB 0209	Bill	March 3, 2021	Legalization	HB 209 passed the House Committee vote 6–3. However, the bill missed the deadline for consideration.
Wyoming	HB 0082	Bill	2021	Medical	
Wyoming	Wyoming Cannabis Amendments	Initiative	June 9, 2021	Decriminalization	
Wyoming	Wyoming Patient Cannabis Act of 2022	Initiative	June 9, 2021	Medical	

Note: Green highlighting indicates passage into law, and may not indicate adult-use legalization.

=== Federal ===
Title	Type	Date introduced	Short description	Detail
H.R.365	Bill	January 19, 2021	Change of DEA scheduling	An act "To provide for the rescheduling of marijuana into Schedule III of the Controlled Substances Act" was introduced by Republican representative Greg Steube on January 19.
H.R.430	Bill	January 21, 2021	Veterans' rights	An act "To prohibit the Secretary of Veterans Affairs from denying a veteran benefits administered by the Secretary by reason of the veteran participating in a State-approved marijuana program, and for other purposes" was introduced by Greg Steube on January 21.
SAFE Banking Act	Bill	March 17, 2021	Banking legalization	Reintroduced on March 17 and passed by the House on April 19.
Hemp Economic Mobilization Plan (HEMP) Act	Bill	March 30, 2021	Redefines hemp	Reintroduced March 30, increasing allowable THC from 0.3% to 1% in Schedule 1-exempt hemp.
HR2588	Bill	April 15, 2021	Medical (veterans)	Introduced by Rep. Barbara Lee
Veterans Medical Marijuana Safe Harbor Act	Bill	April 16, 2021	Medical (veterans)	Introduced on April 16 by U.S. Senator Brian Schatz (D) and U.S. Congressman Dave Joyce (R). Introduced as amendment to 2021 NDAA in November.
S.1467/HR 2916 VA Medicinal Cannabis Research Act of 2021	Bill	April 29, 2021 (April 30 in House)	Medical (veterans)	Eligible for Senate floor vote after being advanced by Senate Committee on Veterans' Affairs on June 23.
S.1467/HR 2916 VA Medicinal Cannabis Research Act of 2021	Bill	April 29, 2021 (April 30 in House)	Medical (veterans)	Passed by House Committee on Veterans' Affairs on November 4.
H.R.3105 Common Sense Cannabis Reform for Veterans, Small Businesses, and Medical Professionals Act	Bill	May 12, 2021	Descheduling	Introduced on May 11, sponsored by Representatives David Joyce (R) and Don Young (R). It would legalize any form of cannabis nationally by removing it from scheduling under the Controlled Substances Act.
H.R. 3617 MORE Act	Bill	May 28, 2021	Legalization and expungement	MORE Act reintroduced
Fully Informed Veteran Act	Bill	June 1, 2021	Medical (veterans)	
Drug Policy Reform Act	Bill	June 18, 2021	Decriminalization	Announced by sponsors on June 15, to be filed on 50th anniversary of the inception of the War on Drugs by President Nixon. Decriminalizes all drugs, and moves classification of drugs from Justice to HHS.
FY22 Financial Services and General Government appropriations bill	Bill	June 29, 2021 (markup)	Banking regulation	The 2021 federal appropriations bill may contain SAFE Banking Act-like cannabis banking provisions.
Cannabis Administration and Opportunity Act	Bill	July 14, 2021	Descheduling	On July 14, Senate Majority Leader Chuck Schumer introduced a draft bill titled Cannabis Administration and Opportunity Act.
FY22 Commerce, Justice, Science and Related Agencies appropriations bill	Bill	July 15, 2021 (committee approval)	Various	May contain protections for state medical cannabis programs and other limits on federal prohibition, funding for CBD regulation. May contain Blumenauer–McClintock–Norton–Lee Amendment recognizing state adult use laws, taking away funding for federal law enforcement activities against them for the lifetime of the appropriations.
National Defense Authorization Act for Fiscal Year 2022	Bill	September 21, 2021	Banking	Language of the SAFE Banking Act added by amendment on September 21. Language of Veterans Medical Marijuana Safe Harbor Act added by Sen. Schatz on November 4. Language concerning both cannabis provisions was ultimately dropped from the bill sent to the Senate in December.
H.R. 5977 States Reform Act	Bill	November 15, 2021	Legalization and expungement	Descheduling from Controlled Substances Act; 3% taxation and regulation by Department of the Treasury; and automatic expungement of past federal cannabis offenses. Introduced by Rep. Nancy Mace and five Republican cosponsors.

== Mass pardons ==
On February 18, 37 members of Congress – including two members of the Congressional Cannabis Caucus, Barbara Lee and Earl Blumenauer, who were the authors – formally asked President Biden to fulfill a campaign promise by issuing a mass presidential pardon to Americans convicted of nonviolent cannabis crimes.

On November 10, a group of senators led by Elizabeth Warren wrote a letter to President Biden requesting him to issue pardons for individuals convicted of nonviolent cannabis crimes, referencing his campaign promise to "zero out" such convictions.
