= Cannabis Regulation and Taxation Act =

Cannabis Regulation and Taxation Act may refer to one of the following:

- Illinois Cannabis Regulation and Tax Act, passed in 2019
- New York Cannabis Regulation and Taxation Act, failed 2021 bill
- Marijuana Regulation and Taxation Act, passed in 2021
- 2018 Michigan Proposal 1, titled Michigan Regulation and Taxation of Marijuana Act, passed in 2018
