= MRTA =

MRTA may refer for:

- Túpac Amaru Revolutionary Movement, Peru (Spanish: Movimiento Revolucionario Túpac Amaru)
- Marijuana Regulation and Taxation Act, a 2021 New York state law legalizing recreational marijuana
- Marketable Record Title Act, a law affecting property title muniment
- Autorité régionale de transport métropolitain, an umbrella organization in Greater Monreal managing road and public transport (English: Metropolitan Regional Transportation Authority)
- Mass Rapid Transit Authority of Thailand
- Montachusett Regional Transit Authority, Massachusetts, United States
