= Brian Mast =

American politician (born 1980)

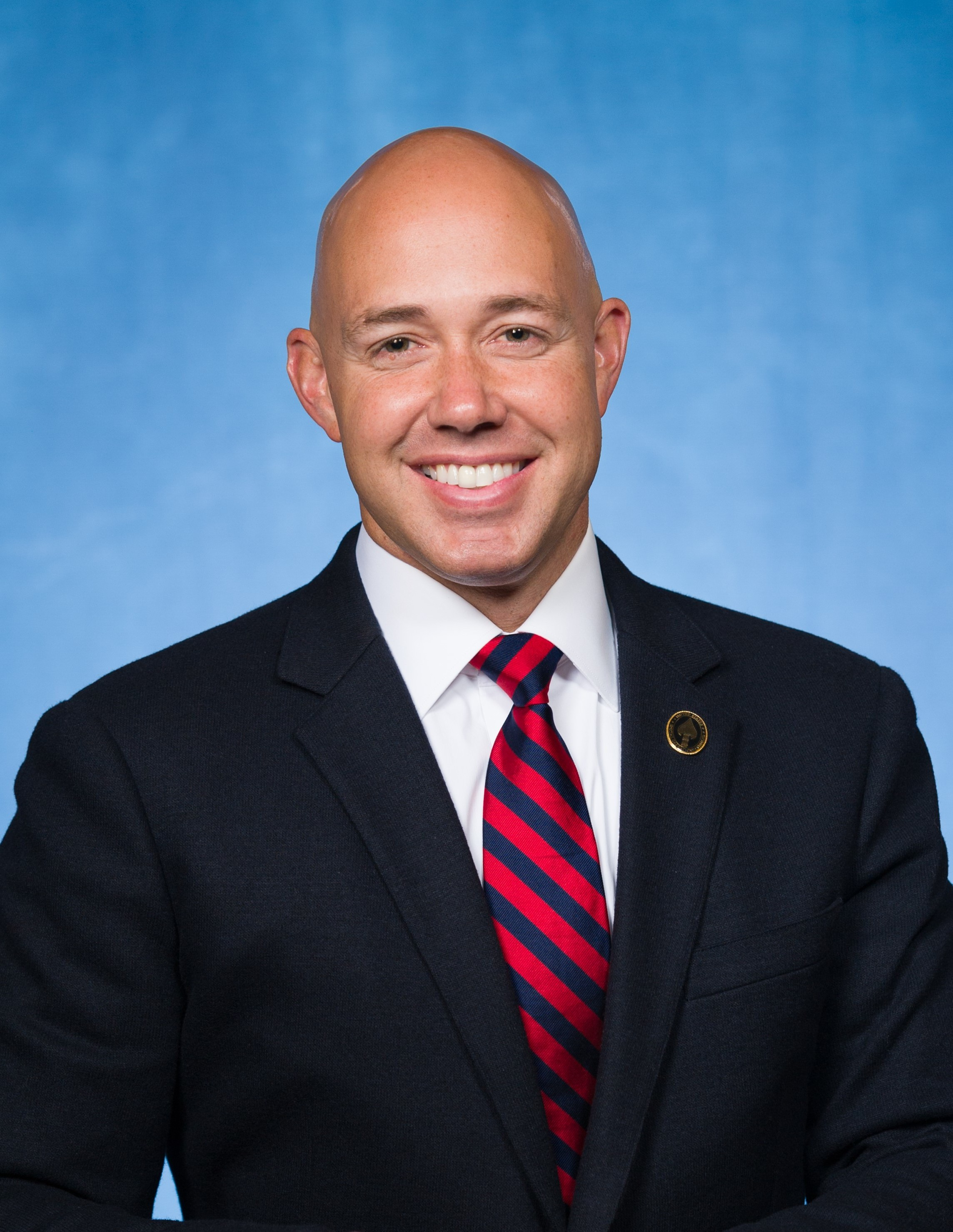
- Official portrait, 2016

Chair of the House Foreign Affairs Committee
- Incumbent
- Assumed office January 3, 2025
- Preceded by: Michael McCaul

Member of the U.S. House of Representatives from Florida
- Incumbent
- Assumed office January 3, 2017
- Preceded by: Patrick Murphy
- Constituency: 18th district (2017–2023); 21st district (2023–present)

Personal details
- Born: Brian Jeffrey Mast; July 10, 1980 (age 46) Grand Rapids, Michigan, U.S.
- Party: Republican
- Spouse: Brianna Watkins (m. 2007)
- Children: 4
- Education: Palm Beach Atlantic University (attended); American Military University (attended); Harvard University (ALB)
- Website: House website Campaign website

Military service
- Allegiance: United States
- Branch/service: United States Army
- Years of service: 2000–2011; 2015
- Rank: Staff Sergeant; Volunteer
- Unit: 28th Ordnance Company Logistics Corps
- Battles/wars: War in Afghanistan; Operation Enduring Freedom
- Awards: Bronze Star Medal; Purple Heart; Defense Meritorious Service Medal; Army Commendation Medal (with valor)

Brian Jeffrey Mast (born July 10, 1980) is an American politician and veteran serving as the U.S. representative for Florida's 21st congressional district since 2017. The district, numbered as the 18th district before the 2020 redistricting cycle, includes the Treasure Coast and northern portions of Palm Beach County. He is a member of the Republican Party.

A veteran of Operation Enduring Freedom, Mast lost both his legs while serving as a U.S. Army bomb disposal technician in Afghanistan in 2010. He received a Bronze Star and Purple Heart for his actions.

Mast was first elected to Congress in 2016. Since 2025, he has served as chair the House Foreign Affairs Committee.

== Early life and education ==
Mast was born and raised in Grand Rapids, Michigan. He is the son of James Mast and Tixomena Trujillo. His maternal grandparents were immigrants from Mexico. Mast graduated from South Christian High School in 1999. In 2016, he obtained a Bachelor of Liberal Arts from the Harvard Extension School with a concentration in economics and minors in government and environmental studies.

== Military service ==
After graduating from high school, Mast enlisted in the United States Army Reserve in May 2000 and became a combat engineer assigned to the 841st Combat Engineer Battalion. In 2006, he transitioned to the active U.S. Army and became an explosive ordnance disposal technician. Mast later joined the 28th Ordnance Company, a special operations explosive ordnance disposal unit that works alongside personnel of the 75th Ranger Regiment. He served in Afghanistan as part of Operation Enduring Freedom. On September 19, 2010, while clearing a path for United States Army Rangers in Kandahar, Mast stepped on an IED along the road. The explosion resulted in the amputation of both his legs and losing his left index finger. Mast received the Bronze Star and Purple Heart for his actions.

Mast and his family were awarded a custom ADA-compliant home by the nonprofit organization Helping a Hero.

== Civilian career ==
After his honorable discharge from the Army, Mast was hired as an explosives specialist for the United States Department of Homeland Security. While recovering from his injuries at Walter Reed Army Medical Center, Mast provided explosive and counter-terrorism expertise to the Office of Emergency Operations at the National Nuclear Security Administration from July 2011 to February 2012, and as an instructor of homemade explosives for the Bureau of Alcohol, Tobacco, Firearms and Explosives.

== U.S. House of Representatives ==
=== Elections ===
==== 2016 ====
Mast first considered running for office while recovering from his injuries at Walter Reed Medical Center. It was reported in May 2015 that he was considering a run for Congress.

On June 8, 2015, Mast announced his candidacy for the Republican nomination for U.S. representative in Florida's 18th congressional district. He defeated five opponents in the August 30, 2016, primary with 38% of the vote. Mast faced Democratic businessman Randy Perkins in the November 8 general election.

During the 2015–16 election campaign, Mast's largest donors were Duty Free Americas, NextGen Management, and Superior Foods.

Mast won the general election with 53% of the vote.

In 2016, Mast was briefly linked with World Patent Marketing, a company the Federal Trade Commission shut down as an invention promotion scam. World Patent Marketing donated money to Mast's campaign fund and said in a press release that he sat on their advisory board. Mast claimed no knowledge of being given a position on the board and said he had only a couple encounters with members of the company.

In 2018, Anthony Bustamante, a campaign consultant who had worked on Mast's 2016 campaign, told The Wall Street Journal that he had used data hacked from the Democratic National Committee by Guccifer 2.0, a front for Russia's GRU military intelligence service, to adjust Mast's campaign strategy. Guccifer 2.0 had leaked the hacked data to the HelloFLA blog.

==== 2018 ====
On April 25, 2018, physician Mark Freeman announced a primary challenge to Mast, focusing on his promise to "defend the Second Amendment" and be an "unwavering partner" to President Donald Trump. Freeman called Mast an "establishment candidate" and complained about Mast's shift on gun control issues after the Parkland school shooting.

Mast defeated Freeman in the Republican primary. In the general election, he defeated Democratic nominee Lauren Baer, an attorney and foreign policy expert who served as an official in the Obama administration, with 54% of the vote.

During the 2017–18 election campaign, Mast's largest donors were Duty Free Americas and Amway/Alticor (run by the DeVos family). Between March and June 2018, Mast's campaign received thousands of dollars from Soviet-born Igor Fruman, one of two business associates of Rudy Giuliani who later faced charges of violating federal campaign finance laws. After this allegedly illegal contribution was discovered and reported by the press, Mast's spokesman said he would disburse the funds to the Treasury Department, but less than two weeks later, Mast said, "I think we donated it to charity."

==== 2020 ====
Mast ran for reelection in 2020 against Democratic nominee Pam Keith. In August 2020 he apologized for what he called "disgusting and inappropriate jokes" that he made on Facebook in 2009 and 2011 responding to a friend and subsequent campaign manager about sex with 15-year-old girls in South Africa and an end-of-the-world pick-up line involving rape or murder. Mast won re-election with 56.32% of the vote, against Keith's 41.5%.

==== 2022 ====
In the 2020 United States redistricting cycle, Florida's district 18 was renamed district 21. Mast was renominated in the Republican Primary with 78.1% of the vote. He defeated Democrat Corinna Robinson in the general election, winning 63.5% of the vote.

==== 2024 ====
Mast ran for reelection and defeated Democrat Thomas Witkop in the general election, winning 61.8% of the vote.

=== Tenure ===
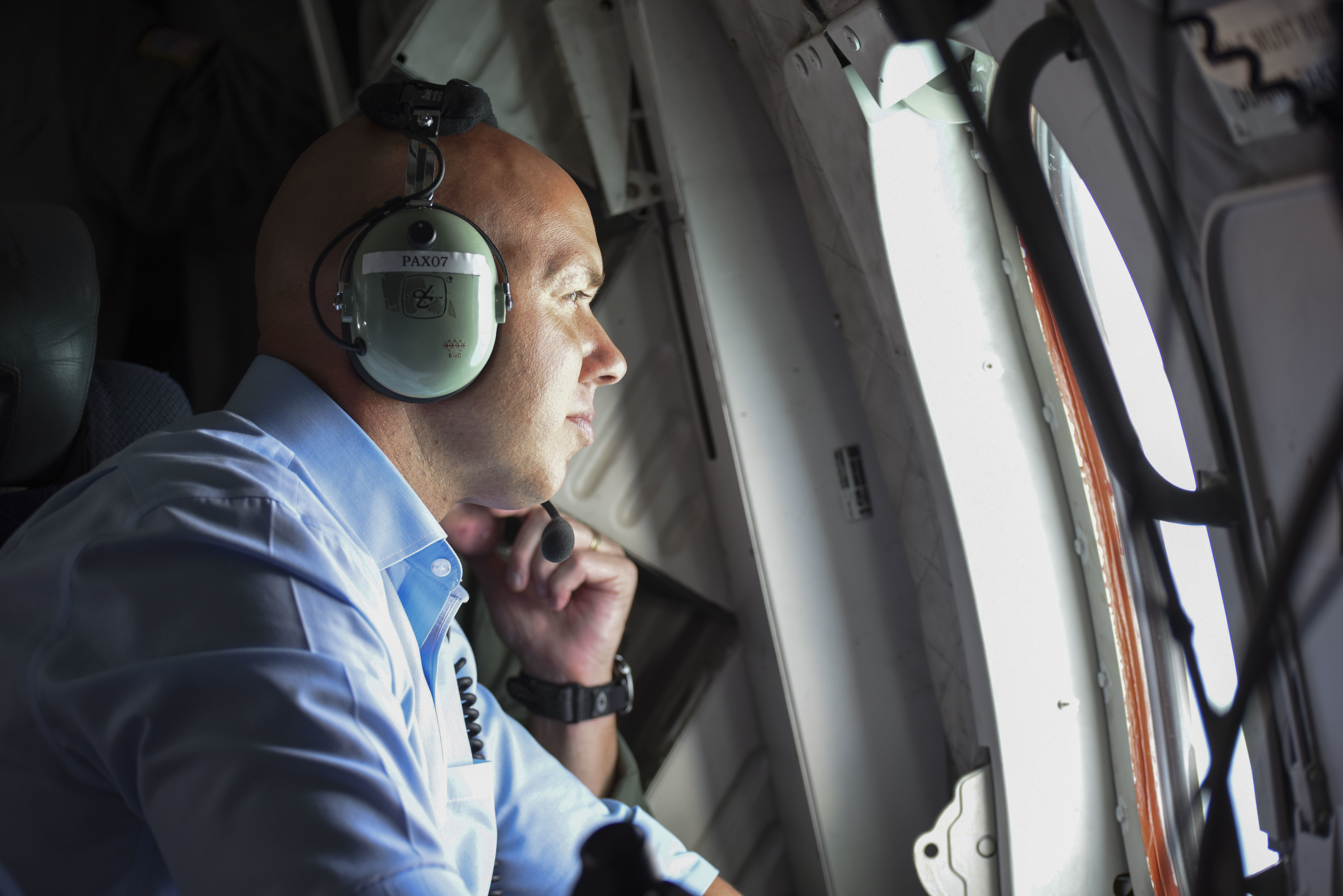
Mast participating in an overflight assessment with the Coast Guard during Hurricane Irma

Mast was sworn in on January 3, 2017. He was a member of the Republican Main Street Partnership and the Climate Solutions Caucus.

After voting in favor of the Tax Cuts and Jobs Act of 2017, he had a 40% approval rating among his constituents; 45% said they were disappointed with his work in Congress.

In May 2018, the Associated Press reported that the Trump administration was considering Mast for secretary of the Department of Veterans Affairs.

==== STOCK Act violations ====
In August 2021, an analysis by Business Insider found that Mast had violated the Stop Trading on Congressional Knowledge (STOCK) Act of 2012, a federal transparency and conflict-of-interest law that requires members of Congress to report certain types of financial transactions within 45 days, by failing to disclose on time a purchase of stock in Virgin Galactic worth up to $100,000 that Mast made in July 2021. In August 2022, Business Insider reported that Mast had again violated the STOCK Act after he sold stock in Ideal Power worth up to $50,000 in February 2021, but which he failed to report until August 2022. Business Insider also found that Mast violated the STOCK Act a third time when, in October 2022, he reported an exchange of shares in Aphria, Inc. for shares of Tilray Brands, Inc. more than a year after the federal deadline.

=== Committee assignments ===
For the 118th Congress:

- Committee on Foreign Affairs (Chair)
  - Subcommittee on the Middle East, North Africa and Central Asia
  - Subcommittee on Oversight and Accountability
- Committee on Transportation and Infrastructure
  - Subcommittee on Aviation
  - Subcommittee on Coast Guard and Maritime Transportation
  - Subcommittee on Water Resources and Environment

=== Caucus memberships ===
- Congressional Cannabis Caucus
- Rare Disease Caucus

== Political positions ==
In the first session of the 115th United States Congress, Mast was ranked the 32nd most bipartisan member of the House by the Bipartisan Index, a metric published by the Lugar Center and Georgetown's McCourt School of Public Policy to assess congressional bipartisanship.

During Trump's presidency, Mast voted in line with the president's stated position 90.6% of the time. As of September 2021, Mast had voted in line with Joe Biden's stated position 19.4% of the time.

=== Abortion ===
Mast believes abortion should be illegal except in cases where the woman's life is at risk or in cases of rape or incest.

=== Agricultural subsidies ===
In April 2018, Mast said he would probably vote for legislation to reduce support for sugar farmers, who, under the contemporaneous Farm Bill, were protected by fixed minimum prices, by limits on imports and on domestic production, and by government loans to sugar growers. "I expect I'll be supporting it when it comes up for a vote next week," Mast said of the Sugar Policy Modernization Act, "because it's important to the community I represent, and our waterways". The proposed act, TCPalm reported, "would make sugar import quotas more flexible and protect taxpayers from government-funded buyouts of surplus sugar". Mast said he would "probably be the only representative in the history of this district to vote against the sugar industry". Mast accepted over $15,000 in campaign donations from the owners and executives of the sugar company Florida Crystals.

=== Cannabis ===
In December 2020, Mast was one of only five House Republicans to vote for the Marijuana Opportunity Reinvestment and Expungement (MORE) Act. The act aimed to "correct the historical injustices of failed drug policies that have disproportionately impacted communities of color"; it included provisions to remove cannabis from the Controlled Substances Act, impose a federal tax on cannabis products, and use the proceeds of the tax to fund restorative justice programs. A month before the vote, Mast invested between $15,000 and $50,000 in the cannabis company Tilray. He disclosed the purchase on December 1.

In November 2021, Mast was one of four original cosponsors of the Republican-led States Reform Act to legalize cannabis federally and regulate it similarly to alcohol. In April 2022, after Representative Don Young died in office, Mast was named to replace him as a co-chair of the Congressional Cannabis Caucus.

=== Donald Trump ===
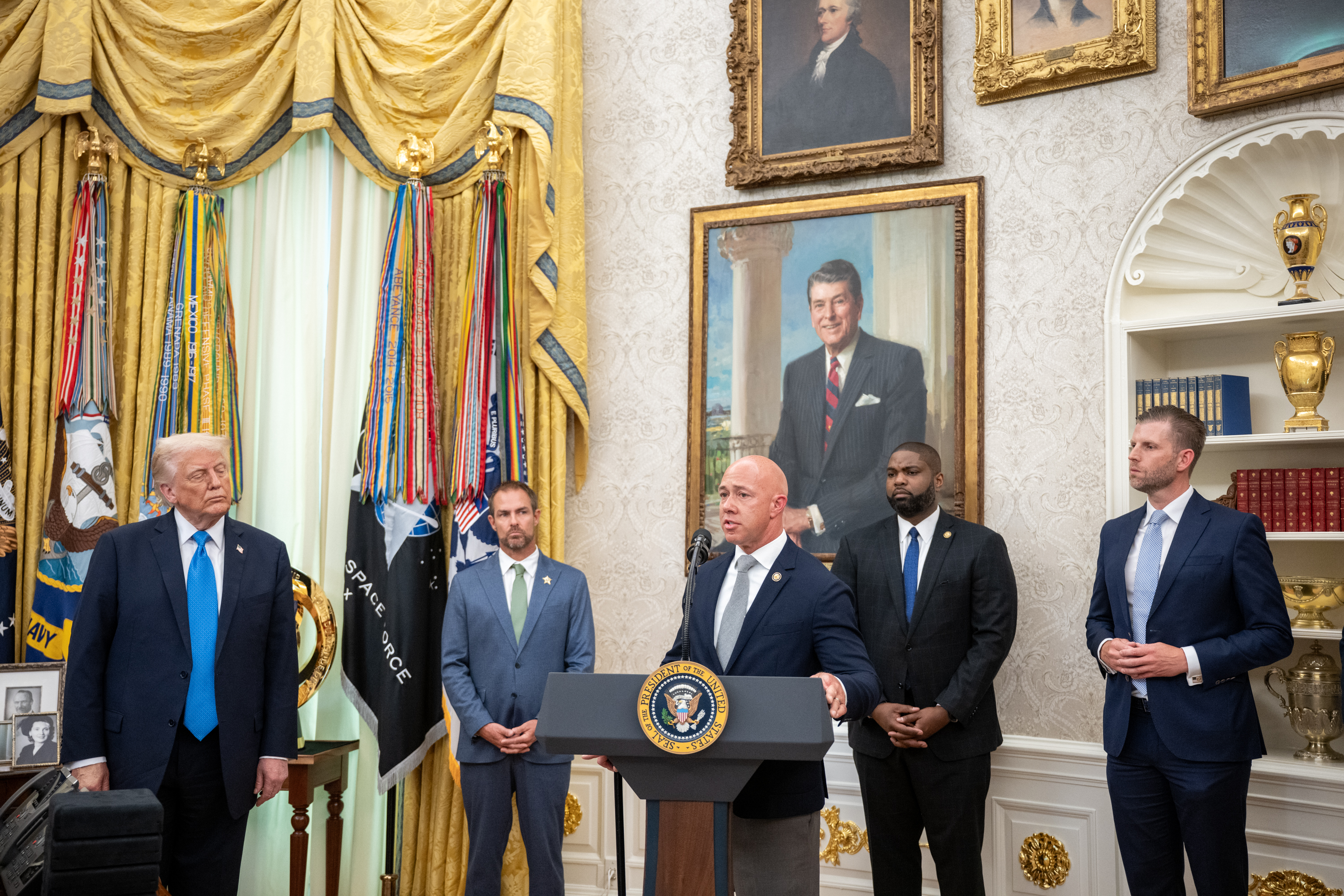
Mast with President Donald Trump, Congressman Byron Donalds, and Eric Trump in the Oval Office, May 2025

In June 2016, Mast said he supported President Donald Trump "unanimously and wholeheartedly" in the 2016 presidential election. After the 2005 Access Hollywood recording of Trump making crude remarks about sexually assaulting women became public, Mast called Trump's remarks "inexcusable and disgusting". In February 2017, he voted against a resolution that would have directed the House to request ten years of Trump's tax returns, which would then have been reviewed by the House Ways and Means Committee in a closed session.

On December 18, 2019, Mast voted against both articles of impeachment against Trump. Of the 195 Republicans who voted, all voted against both impeachment articles.

On January 6, 2021, following the attack on the U.S. Capitol, Mast and 146 other Republican members of Congress voted against certifying the election of President Joe Biden.

=== LGBTQ+ rights ===
Mast believes it was a mistake for the U.S. Supreme Court to rule on the constitutionality of same-sex marriage in Obergefell v. Hodges. Later, on July 19, 2022, he was among 47 Republican representatives who voted for the Respect for Marriage Act, which would codify the right to same-sex marriage in federal law. However, Mast voted against final passage on December 8, 2022.

=== Free speech ===
In September 2025, Mast co-sponsored proposed legislation which would grant the U.S. Secretary of State the ability to revoke passports from Americans who criticize Israel. Media sources compared the proposal to the Thought Police. Mast later filed an amendment to remove this provision from the proposed legislation, without comment.

=== Gun control ===
In 2018, Mast wrote an opinion piece in The New York Times in support of the Second Amendment right to bear arms, but said "it does not guarantee that every civilian can bear any and all arms." He supports a ban on assault weapons, citing his military background: "I cannot support the primary weapon I used to defend our people being used to kill the children I swore to defend."

After the Stoneman Douglas High School shooting, Mast announced his support for prohibiting the sale of assault and tactical firearms without confiscating such weapons that are already owned; ensuring that all firearm purchasers undergo a background check; improving background checks; banning the sale of gun accessories that enhance the firing rate of weapons, such as bump stocks; preventing those who have been detained for mental illnesses from purchasing firearms; ensuring that those on the Terror Watch List cannot purchase firearms; and placing anyone who makes threats of violence against schools on an FBI watch list for "a long time".

Mast also supports conducting further research on gun violence, which would require a change in federal law.

Mast has partly blamed violent video games and violent movies for school shootings. In March 2017, he voted for the Veterans Second Amendment Protection Act.

During his 2015–16 election campaign, Mast accepted $4,950 in campaign donations from the NRA Political Victory Fund.

=== Healthcare ===
Mast is in favor of repealing the Affordable Care Act. On May 4, 2017, he voted to repeal the Affordable Care Act and pass the American Health Care Act.

=== Immigration ===
In June 2018, commenting on the Trump administration family separation policy, Mast said: "It is our duty as an American government to deal compassionately with any child from any nation, just as it is the responsibility of foreign families seeking asylum in the U.S. to choose only legal means to enter our nation so they can avoid family disruption. I am confident this process will be improved." Citing his own Mexican grandparents, he said, "The way that they got to work, the way that they assimilated to the American way of life and became a part of our system is not what we're seeing across the board."

=== Foreign policy ===
Mast said he would support a Republican proposal to cut U.S. funding to the United Nations.

==== Middle East ====
Mast was critical of Obama's Middle East policy. "ISIS is as strong as it is because of a lack of US leadership," he said in 2016. "ISIS could have been defeated at the time of the Arab Spring if we had sent in special operations forces. What's being done now is too little too late. It's going to require an all-out military effort. The only way to guarantee peace is to make the enemy surrender."

Mast views Obama's Iran nuclear deal as a betrayal by the U.S. of its own national security as well as that of Israel, Jordan, and other regional allies. "The deal has aligned us with a Shia regime, which is just enabling extremism. This is going to make it very hard to get Sunni regimes to align with us, and Putin is now the go-to player in Syria with his alliance with Assad," he said in 2016.

Mast is "a vocal supporter of Israel and Israelis", reported The Times of Israel during his 2016 campaign. "If anyone was lobbing rockets into the US, guys like me would be sent to kill them, and Americans would applaud us," he said. In January 2015, Mast volunteered with the Israel Defense Forces (IDF) through Sar-El, working at a base outside Tel Aviv packing medical kits and moving supplies. Following the 2023 Hamas-led attack on Israel, Mast wore his IDF uniform in Congress.

On November 1, 2023, in arguing for a bill to reduce humanitarian funding to Gaza during the Gaza war, Mast compared Palestinian civilians to the civilians of Nazi Germany during World War II, saying:

I would encourage the other side to not so lightly throw around the idea of innocent Palestinian civilians, as is frequently said, I don't think we would so lightly throw around the term 'innocent Nazi civilians' during World War II. It is not a far stretch to say there are very few innocent Palestinian civilians.

In February 2024, Code Pink protesters confronted Mast outside his Congressional office over his support for the Israeli invasion of Gaza. When a protester asked Mast "You haven't seen the pictures of all the babies being killed?", Mast replied "These are not innocent Palestinian civilians." Mast said that "It would be better if you kill all the terrorists and kill everyone who are supporters." Mast said that the "half a million people starving to death" should remove Hamas from power and install a pro-Israeli government in Gaza.

Following the fall of the Assad regime, Mast advocated for maintaining the Caesar Act rather than repealing it because of the Islamist nature of the new Syrian government. He also expressed his support for the establishment of an independent Kurdistan within what is currently Syrian territory, in recognition of the Kurds' role in the fight against ISIS. During a November 2025 meeting with Syrian President Ahmed al-Sharaa, Mast discussed the future of Syria, emphasizing the need for peace, the defeat of ISIS and extremism, and heard al-Sharaa outline Syria's desire for economic reconstruction and foreign investment as a path to stability, though Mast did not change his position on sanctions after the meeting.

In February 2026, as chairman of the House Foreign Affairs Committee, Mast headed a full committee hearing titled "Syria at a Crossroads: U.S. Policy Challenges Post-Assad," where he outlined ongoing security and political challenges facing Syria and U.S. interests in the region after Assad's overthrow.

==== Ukraine ====
In April 2024, Mast opposed legislation to grant additional military aid to Ukraine.

=== Military and veterans affairs ===
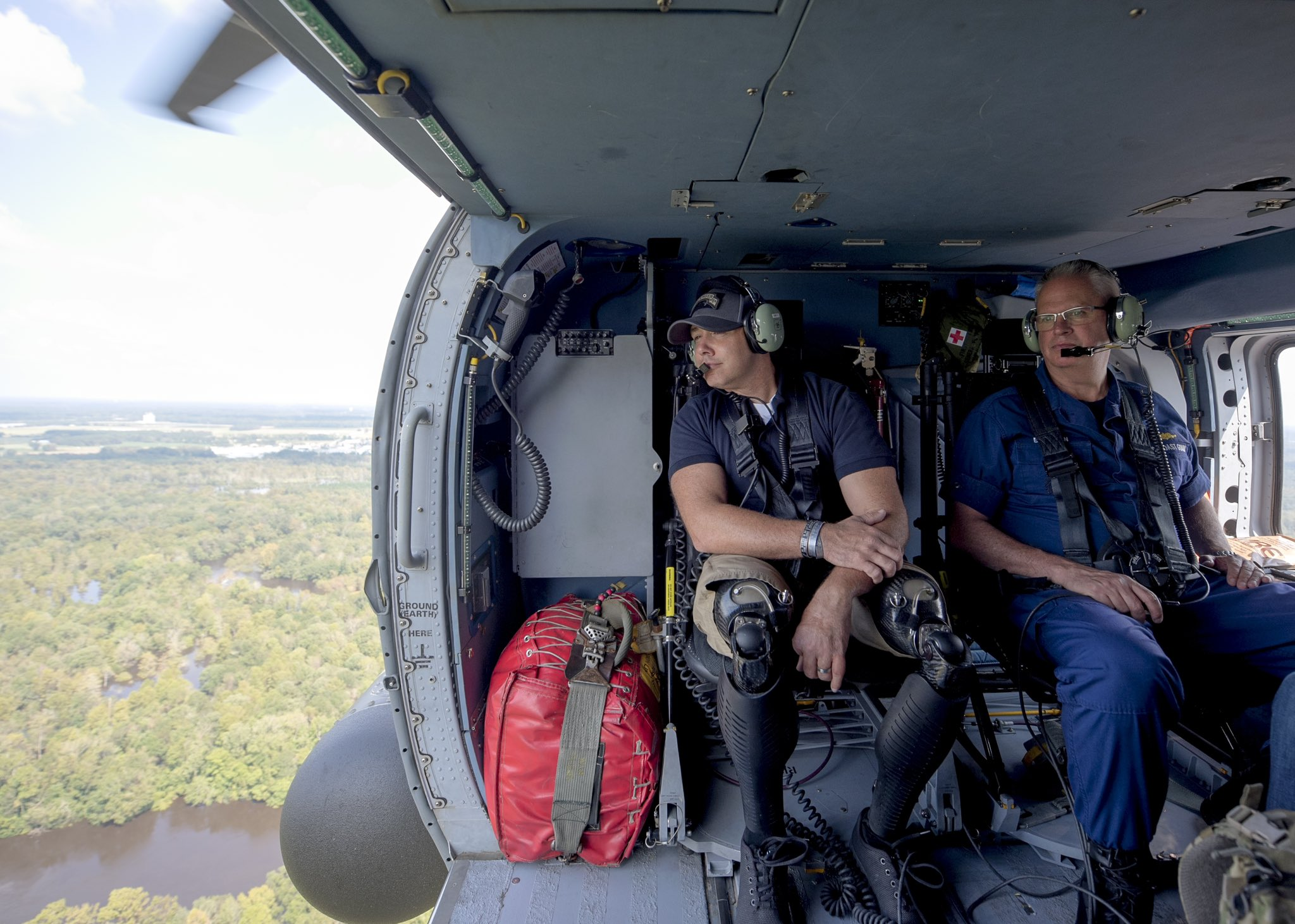
Mast in a helicopter surveying Florida, January 2025

Mast, who sits on the House Veterans Affairs Committee, was the first member of Congress to open an office inside a federal agency. The office in question, which opened in 2018, was in the West Palm Beach Veterans Affairs facility. In 2018 he introduced a House bill that would make it easier for other House members to do the same. In 2019, the Department of Veterans Affairs evicted Mast from the West Palm Beach office.

=== Taxes and budget ===
In October 2017, Mast voted against the original version of the Tax Cuts and Jobs Act of 2017 due to "out of control" federal spending, fear of the national debt growing, and a desire to see lower tax rates with loopholes closed. In December 2017, he voted for the final version of the bill, saying it "provides a lot of confidence to a lot of people" and is "a great moment for our country and our community".

== Honors ==
During his 12 years of U.S. Army service, Mast received the Bronze Star Medal, Purple Heart, Defense Meritorious Service Medal and Army Commendation Medal with "V" for valor device. President Barack Obama invited Mast as a guest to his 2011 State of the Union Address, at which he was seated with First Lady Michelle Obama and Second Lady Jill Biden.

== Personal life ==
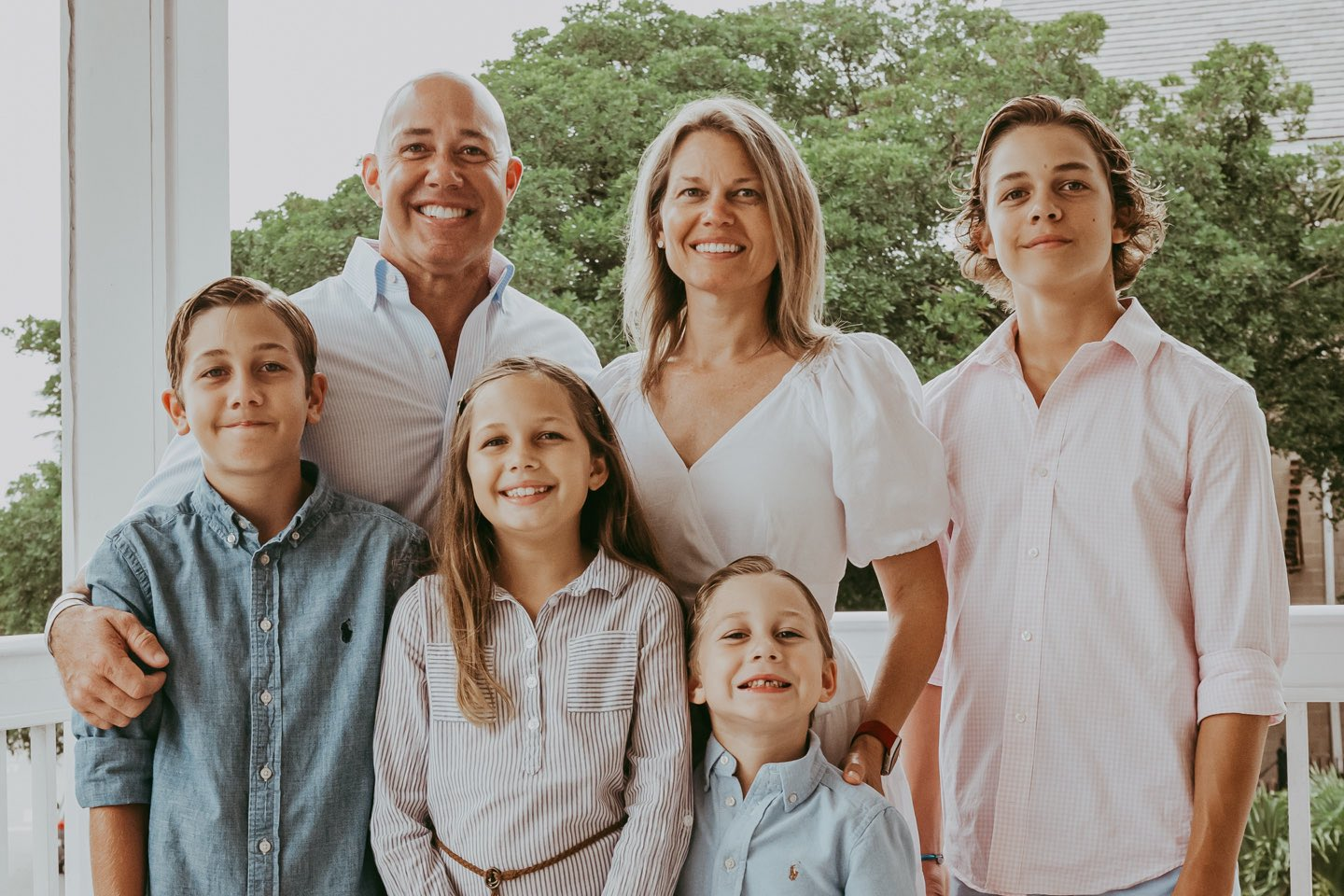
Mast family in May 2025

Mast lives in Palm City, Florida, with his wife Brianna and their four children. As recently as 2016, he attended the evangelical Calvary Chapel.

== See also ==
- List of Harvard University politicians
- List of Hispanic and Latino Americans in the United States Congress

U.S. House of Representatives
Preceded by Patrick Murphy	Member of the U.S. House of Representatives from Florida's 18th congressional district 2017–2023	Succeeded by Scott Franklin
Preceded by Lois Frankel	Member of the U.S. House of Representatives from Florida's 21st congressional district 2023–present	Incumbent
Preceded by Michael McCaul	Chair of the House Foreign Affairs Committee; 2025–present	Incumbent
U.S. order of precedence (ceremonial)
Preceded by David Kustoff	United States representatives by seniority 173rd	Succeeded by Jimmy Panetta
