= Emergency Afghan Allies Extension Act of 2014 =

- Long title: To provide additional visas for the Afghan Special Immigrant Visa Program, and for other purposes.
- Announced in: the 113th United States Congress
- Sponsored by: Rep. Earl Blumenauer (D-OR)
- Number of co-sponsors: 4

Citations
- Public law: Pub. L. 113–160 (text) (PDF)

Legislative history
- Introduced in the House as H.R. 5195 by Rep. Earl Blumenauer (D-OR) on July 24, 2014; Committee consideration by United States House Committee on the Judiciary, United States House Committee on Foreign Affairs; Passed the House on July 30, 2014 (voice vote); Passed the Senate on August 1, 2014 (voice vote); Signed into law by President Barack Obama on August 8, 2014

The Emergency Afghan Allies Extension Act of 2014 (H.R. 5195; Pub. L. 113–160 (text) (PDF)) is a United States federal law that authorizes an additional 1,000 emergency Special Immigrant Visas that the United States Department of State could issue to Afghan translators who served with U.S. troops during the War in Afghanistan.

The bill was introduced into the United States House of Representatives during the 113th United States Congress. It was signed into law on August 8, 2014 by President Barack Obama.

== Background ==
During the War in Afghanistan, the United States promised some Afghans protection in exchange for being translators for the U.S. In 2009, the United States began issuing 3,000 visas each year to Afghans, and their families, who helped the United States during the war, usually by being an interpreter or a guide.

== Provisions of the bill ==
This summary is based largely on the summary provided by the Congressional Research Service, a public domain source.

The bill would amend the Afghan Allies Protection Act of 2009 to increase by 1,000 the number of Afghan special immigrant visas available in FY2014.

The bill would require, with regard to such visas, that:

- the period during which an alien must have been employed must terminate by December 31, 2014,
- the principal alien seeking special immigrant status shall apply to the Chief of Mission by December 31, 2014, and
- the authority to provide such status shall terminate on December 31, 2014.

The bill would direct the United States Secretary of State, by January 1, 2015, to increase temporarily the fee or surcharge (by $1) for processing machine-readable nonimmigrant visas and machine-readable combined border crossing identification cards and nonimmigrant visas.

== Procedural history ==
The Emergency Afghan Allies Extension Act of 2014 was introduced into the United States House of Representatives on July 24, 2014 by Rep. Earl Blumenauer (D-OR). The bill was referred to the United States House Committee on the Judiciary and the United States House Committee on Foreign Affairs. On July 30, 2014, the House voted to pass the bill in a voice vote. The Senate passed the bill on August 1, 2014 and President Barack Obama signed it into law on August 8, 2014.

== Debate and discussion ==
According to Rep. Blumenauer, who sponsored the bill, there was "need for immediate action because the State Department has confirmed they have completely exhausted all visas Congress authorized in December." Blumenauer argued that "a failure to provide these additional visas ensures the many brave translators the U.S. promised to protect in exchange for their services would be left in Afghanistan, hiding, their lives still threatened daily by the Taliban."

== See also ==
- Withdrawal of U.S. troops from Afghanistan (2011–2016)
