= 1992 Portland, Oregon, mayoral election =

- November 3, 1992
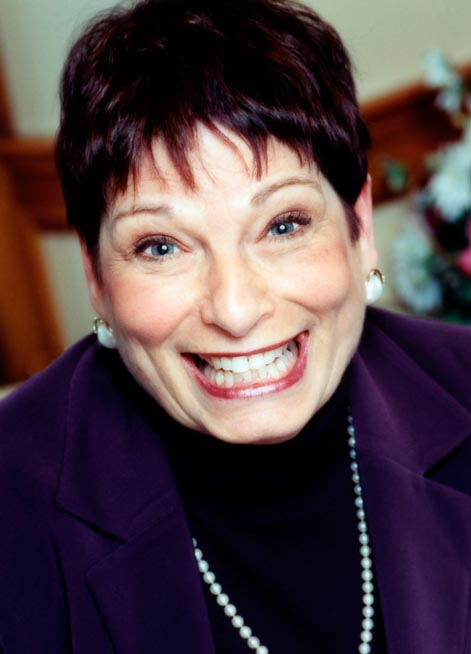

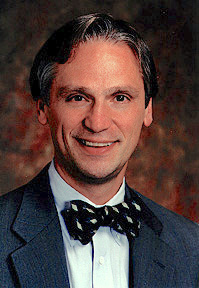

Nominee	Vera Katz	Earl Blumenauer	Mike Fahey
First-round vote	56,636	44,134	8,078
First-round percentage	46.79%	36.46%	6.67%
Second-round vote	130,319	97,789
Second-round percentage	56.68%	42.53%
Mayor before election
Bud Clark
Elected mayor
Vera Katz

On May 19, 1992 and November 3, 1992, elections were held in Portland, Oregon, to elect the mayor. Former Speaker of the Oregon House of Representatives Vera Katz was elected, defeating Portland City Commissioner (and future Congressman) Earl Blumenauer.

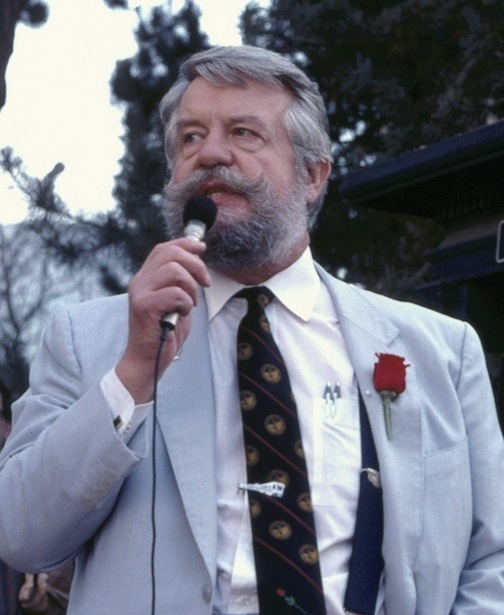
Bud Clark, the incumbent mayor, whose term expired on January 3, 1993.

Portland uses a nonpartisan system for local elections, in which all voters are eligible to participate. All candidates are listed on the ballot without any political party affiliation.

All candidates meeting the qualifications competed in a blanket primary election on May 19, 1992. As no candidate received an absolute majority, the top two finishers advanced to a runoff in the November 3 general election.

== Candidates ==
- Vera Katz, former Speaker of the Oregon House of Representatives
- Earl Blumenauer, city commissioner
- Michael T. Fahey, Sr., former state representative
- Barry L. Bloom
- Jaunita M. Crawford
- Demetrios Deligiorgis
- Robert T. Domenico
- Joseph W. Doyle
- Charley Gilbert
- Sardar Singh Khalsa
- Jada Mae Langloss
- Peter S. Nilsson
- Michael W. Schenatzki
- Richard Elliot (Tres) Shannon III

== Results ==
=== Primary ===
1992 Portland mayoral primary election
Party	Candidate	Votes	%
Nonpartisan	Vera Katz	56,636	46.79
Nonpartisan	Earl Blumenauer	44,134	36.46
Nonpartisan	Mike Fahey	8,078	6.67
Nonpartisan	Joseph W. Doyle	2,434	2.01
Nonpartisan	Michael W. Schenatzki	1,813	1.49
Nonpartisan	Richard Elliot (Tres) Shannon III	1,384	1.14
Nonpartisan	Barry L. Bloom	1,383	1.14
Nonpartisan	Charlie Gilbert	1,090	0.90
Nonpartisan	Juanita M. Crawford	946	0.78
Nonpartisan	Demetrios Deligiorgis	798	0.65
Nonpartisan	Robert T. Domenico	634	0.52
Nonpartisan	Peter S. Nilsson	527	0.43
Nonpartisan	Sardar Singh Khalsa	524	0.43
Nonpartisan	Jada Mae Langloss	227	0.18
Write-in		410	0.33
Total votes		121,018	100

=== General ===
1992 Portland mayoral general election
Party	Candidate	Votes	%
Nonpartisan	Vera Katz	130,319	56.68
Nonpartisan	Earl Blumenauer	97,789	42.53
Write-in		1,480	0.64
Total votes		229,888	100
