= Cannabis in New York =

New York's Cannabis Universal Symbol

Cannabis in New York has been legal for medical purposes under New York law since 2016, and recreational purposes since 2021. As of 2022, recreational cannabis is for sale legally in the state (including Native American reservations), only through state-approved dispensaries.

Adults 21 and older are allowed to possess up to 3 ounces (85 g) of cannabis and 0.85 ounces (24 g) of concentrated cannabis. In addition, home cultivation of up to three mature and three immature cannabis plants per individual will be permitted, with a maximum of twelve plants per household, once regulations for home grow are in place.

On March 30, 2021, both houses of the New York State Legislature approved legislation to legalize recreational marijuana. The bill was signed into law by former New York Governor Andrew Cuomo on March 31, 2021. The law also resulted in previous marijuana-related criminal records in the state of New York being expunged. As of October 2021, New York State prohibited employers from testing both prospective and current employees for cannabis use or otherwise discriminating against employees who use cannabis outside of work hours.

Smoking marijuana in public is subject to the same enforcement and penalties as smoking tobacco. Local laws such as the Smoke Free Air Act prohibit the burning of marijuana or its use in electronic cigarettes in most public spaces.

== History ==
=== Prohibition (1927) ===
In 1914, New York first began to restrict cannabis by requiring a prescription to obtain the drug. In an amendment to the Boylan Bill, they added "Cannabis indica, which is the Indian hemp from which the East Indian drug called hashish is manufactured," to the city's list of restricted drugs. The New York Times on the following day commented: "Devotees of hashish are now hardly numerous enough here to count, but they are likely to increase as other narcotics become harder to obtain." In their study of the history of marijuana prohibition, Richard J. Bonnie & Charles H. Whitebread note that "only four articles about marijuana appeared in the major New York newspaper during the entire period from 1914 until 1927." In 1927, New York removed the medical purposes and restricted cannabis completely.

In New York City, there were more than 19,000 kg (41,000 lb) of marijuana growing like weeds throughout the boroughs until 1951, when the "White Wing Squad", headed by the Sanitation Department General Inspector John E. Gleason, was charged with destroying the many pot farms that had sprouted up across the city. The Brooklyn Public Library reports: this group was held to a high moral standard and was prohibited from "entering saloons, using foul language, and neglecting horses." The Squad found the most weed in Queens but even in Brooklyn dug up "millions of dollars" worth of the plants, many as "tall as Christmas trees". Gleason oversaw incineration of the plants in Woodside, Queens.

=== La Guardia Committee (1939–1944) ===
In 1939, New York Mayor Fiorello LaGuardia assigned a committee to investigate the issue of cannabis in his city. The committee released its report in 1944, concluding that the "gateway theory" was largely false, and that cannabis was not widely associated with addiction, school children, or juvenile delinquency. The report infuriated Harry Anslinger, commissioner of the Federal Bureau of Narcotics, who branded it unscientific.

=== Rockefeller Drug Laws (1973) ===
In 1973, New York governor Nelson Rockefeller signed legislation increasing the penalty for selling two ounces (57 g) or more of heroin, morphine, "raw or prepared opium," cocaine, or cannabis or possessing four ounces (110 g) or more of the same substances, was a minimum of 15 years to life in prison, and a maximum of 25 years to life in prison.

=== Partial decriminalization (1977) ===
In 1977, New York decriminalized possession of 25 grams (7/8 oz) or less of marijuana, to an infraction with a $100 fine (equivalent to $530 in 2025). However, possession in public view remained a misdemeanor, and civil rights advocates stated that this was used as a loophole to unfairly arrest. A New York Times editorial noted in 2012:

Marijuana arrests declined after passage of the 1977 law, but that changed in the 1990s. Between 1997 and 2010, the city arrested 525,000 people for low-level, public-view possession, according to a legislative finding.

=== New York City further decriminalization (2014) ===
In response to the continued arrests for marijuana possession, in 2014, New York City mayor Bill de Blasio directed the NYPD to cease arrests, and instead issue tickets, for small possession even in cases where the 1977 law might allow an arrest, such as cannabis entering "public view" during a stop-and-frisk. However, the Village Voice noted in 2016 that despite a sudden drop following de Blasio's direction, arrests have "gone back up just as quickly."

In 2018 the Manhattan and Brooklyn district attorneys announced that they would continue reducing the set of offenses that they would prosecute.

=== Medical cannabis legalization (2014) ===
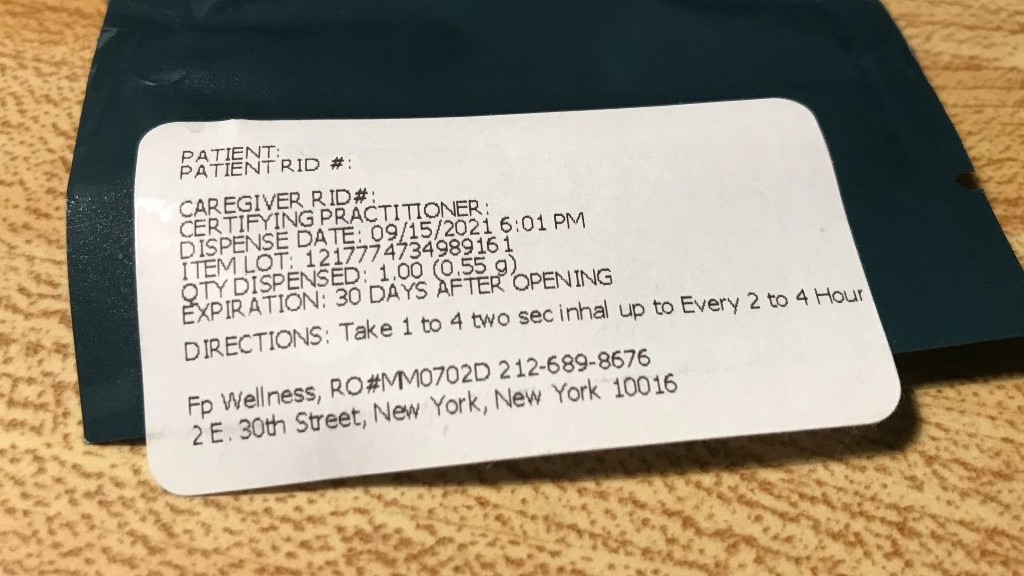
A New York medical cannabis prescription

In July 2014, New York Governor Andrew Cuomo signed legislation permitting the use of cannabis for medical purposes, following a "lengthy, emotional debate" in the issue in the Senate and 49–10 Senate vote. Cuomo's signing began an 18-month window for the state Department of Health to enact a medical marijuana program to provide non-smoked methods of cannabis consumption to patients. The legislation awarded five contracts to private marijuana growers who would each be allowed to operate four dispensaries. As of December 2021, the program had 3,455 practitioners and 151,284 patients.

=== State law as of 2016 ===
Offenses related to the possession or sale of marijuana and "concentrated cannabis", outside those allowed by the state's medical marijuana statute, are defined in Article 221 of the New York State Penal Law. The former term is defined in the state's Public Health Law as "all parts of the plant of the genus Cannabis, whether growing or not; the seeds thereof; the resin extracted from any part of the plant; and every compound, manufacture, salt, derivative, mixture, or preparation of the plant, its seeds or resin." Stalks from the mature plant, fiber, oil and cake made from it, sterilized seeds and compounds or preparations from them are not considered marijuana. "Concentrated cannabis", meant primarily to refer to hashish, refers to the plant's "separated resin, whether crude or purified" and any substance, whether derived from the plant or not, containing more than 2.5% by weight of delta-9-Tetrahydrocannabinol (THC), delta-8 dibenzopyran, delta-1-THC or delta-1 (6) monoterpene, an isomer of the last compound.

Possession of less than 25 grams (7/8 oz) of marijuana, in any form, is unlawful possession of marijuana, punishable by a fine of no more than $100 if the defendant has no convictions for the offense within the last three years. Those who do can be fined up to $200; on the third conviction within that time period the maximum fine rises to $250 with the possibility of a 15-day jail sentence as well. The offense is considered a violation, the lowest level of offense defined in state law, and thus does not show up on a criminal record.

If the marijuana is burning or in public view, no matter the amount, or is between 25 and 57 grams (7/8–2 oz), it is fifth-degree criminal possession of marijuana, a Class B misdemeanor, carrying a possible three-month sentence. Amounts in the 2–8 ounces (57–227 g) range are fourth-degree criminal possession of marijuana, a Class A misdemeanor for which offenders can receive up to six months in jail. Convictions for these offenses will result in a criminal record.

Amounts higher than 8 ounces (230 g) are felonies, all of which carry a minimum prison term of three years in New York. Third-degree criminal possession of marijuana, a Class E felony with up to four years as a possible punishment, applies to amounts between 8 and 16 ounces (230–450 g), or one pound. Those convicted of second-degree criminal possession of marijuana, a Class D felony with a maximum sentence of seven years, will have been in possession of up to 10 pounds (4.5 kg) and can expect to serve up to seven years at most. First-degree criminal possession of marijuana applies to those with more than 10 pounds, a Class C felony for which offenders may spend 15 years in prison.

Offenses related to the sale of marijuana start with fifth-degree criminal sale of marijuana, a class B misdemeanor that covers amounts less than 2 grams (0.071 oz). Fourth-degree criminal sale of marijuana, a class A misdemeanor, covers sales between that amount and 25 grams (7/8 oz). Amounts up to 4 ounces (110 g) are third-degree criminal sale of marijuana, a Class E felony.

Sales in the 4–16 ounces (110–450 g) range get the offender a conviction for second-degree criminal sale of marijuana, a Class D felony. That offense also applies to any sale of a lesser amount to a minor. Sales of more than one pound (450 g) are considered first-degree criminal sale of marijuana, a Class C felony.

=== Legalization study (2018) ===
In his 2018 State of the State address Governor Cuomo urged the New York State Legislature to fund a study on the effects of legalizing marijuana for recreational use. The proposed study would be conducted by the Department of Health to examine a wide variety of issues, including the legal, economic, and social ramifications recreational marijuana could have on New York.

The Department of Health completed its study and recommended the legalization of marijuana in New York, citing economic, public health, and public safety benefits. Cuomo stated that New York should "legalize the adult use of recreational marijuana once and for all," and that his marijuana legalization proposal would be including the state's 2019 budget plan. The study was followed by an amended Marijuana Regulation and Taxation Act bill, which would legalize and regulate cannabis in the state.

=== Additional reforms with further decriminalization in the State of New York (2019) ===
In July 2019, New York enacted legislation signed into law by Governor Andrew Cuomo on July 29, 2019 that further expanded the decriminalization of recreational use of cannabis in the State of New York, but did not legalize it. This measure would treat possession of up to two ounces (57 g) of marijuana as a violation instead of a crime, with fines dropping to as low as $50 (equivalent to $63 in 2025).

=== Recreational legalization (2021) ===
Between 2018 and 2021, New York lawmakers repeatedly attempted to legalize recreational cannabis via the legislative process, but disagreements over allocation of tax revenue from cannabis sales (and in the case of the 2020 session, the COVID-19 pandemic) prevented legislation from moving forward. Legalization was included in the 2021 state budget proposal as the Cannabis Regulation and Taxation Act. Members of the New York State Assembly objected to some provisions of the bill, with some expressing a preference to pass their own legislation independent of the governor's office, the Marijuana Regulation and Taxation Act (MRTA).

Negotiations between the governor's office and the legislature over the final cannabis legalization bill were successful and the MRTA was passed in the New York State Assembly and Senate on March 30, 2021 by votes of 94-56 and 40-23, respectively. Governor Andrew Cuomo signed the bill into law the following day. This legislation legalized recreational cannabis where adults aged 21 and over are allowed to possess up to 3 ounces (85 g) of cannabis or 0.85 ounces (24 g) of concentrated cannabis. Adults 21 and older are allowed to possess up to 5 pounds (2.3 kg) individually in their own homes. In addition, home cultivation of up to three mature and three immature cannabis plants per individual will be permitted, with a maximum of twelve plants per household, once regulations for home grow are in place. On April 9, 2021, marijuana-related criminal records in the state of New York which previously resulted in losses of jobs, homes and licenses were confirmed to have been expunged by the law as well.

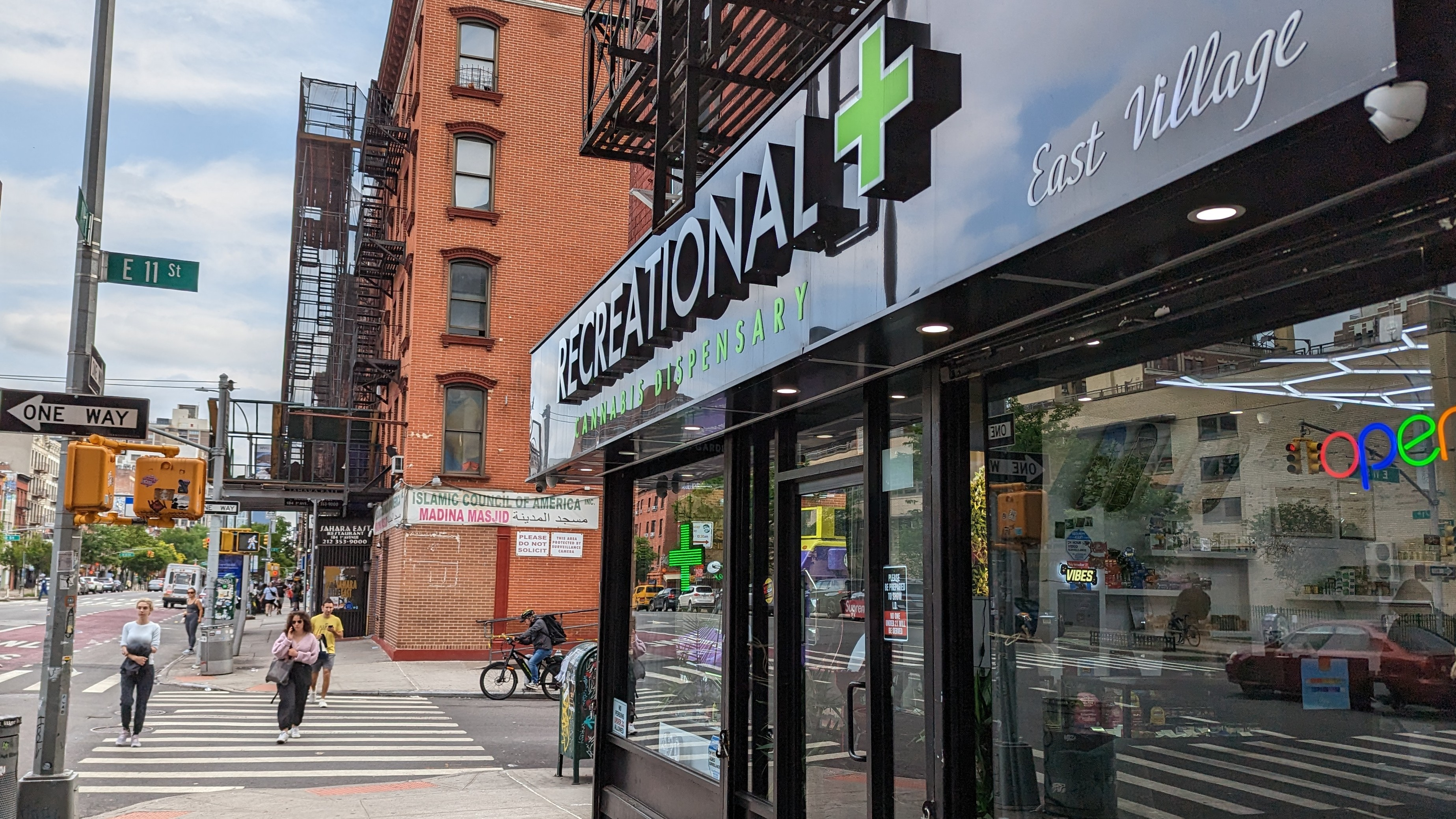
Cannabis dispensary in East Village, New York City

Aside from driving under the influence, the NYPD no longer lists any other crime related to marijuana.

As of October 2021, New York State prohibited employers from testing both prospective and current employees for cannabis use or otherwise discriminating against employees who use cannabis outside of work hours.

Licensed sale of recreational cannabis in New York is expected to begin by 2023. The state has set up a new campaign so cannabis consumers know if they are purchasing from a licensed facility.

As of April 2022, 52 recreational cannabis cultivation licenses have been granted and approved within New York State.

The first legal purchase of recreational cannabis was made in a dispensary operated by Housing Works in Greenwich Village, Manhattan on 29 December 2022.

== 2022 New York State hemp farmers bill ==
In February 2022, a bill signed into law by the Governor Kathy Hochul legally allows New York State hemp farmers to start growing cannabis crops. The law also promotes equity for minorities and other related purposes.

== New York State tax breaks ==
In April 2022, the New York Legislature passed a comprehensive omnibus Budget Bill – with provisions that explicitly legally allows cannabis related businesses and/or dispensaries to have "tax breaks" within New York State itself (not federally, due to cannabis still being illegal federally). On April 9th 2022, the Governor of New York passed the FY2023 budget and signed into law Senate Bill S8009C, which amended the state tax code related to cannabis businesses. This bill specifically created paragraphs to the state tax code to add back "the amount of any federal deduction disallowed pursuant to Section 280e of the IRC related to the production and distribution of adult-use cannabis products, as defined by Article 20C of this chapter, not used as the basis for any other tax deduction, exemption, or credit, and not otherwise required" in the computation of entire net income and of New York adjusted gross income. The final state budget includes provisions for licensed cannabis businesses to take ordinary tax deductions for tax years beginning in 2023. For now, businesses operating within New York City will still be impacted by 280e, although Senate Bill S7508 is set to pass and would mimic the state level changes.

== Further New York regulations approved ==
In April 2022, further regulations were approved by state boards – to allow cultivation of medical cannabis on certain licensed farms within New York.

== 2023 update to medical cannabis program ==
As of March 2023, there was a significant update to the New York Medical Cannabis Program. The update streamlined the process for patients seeking medical marijuana. Now, when a healthcare provider certifies a patient for medical cannabis, the patient is automatically registered in the program. The medical cannabis certification provided by the healthcare provider contains a registry ID number, which can be used alongside a valid government-issued ID to purchase medical cannabis at registered dispensaries. This change eliminated the need for patients to separately register for a medical marijuana card after receiving certification from a healthcare provider.

== Curbing illegal and illicit cannabis markets ==
In May 2023, the Governor of New York State signed into law an "omnibus budget bill" (that recently passed the Legislature) that explicitly curbs illegal and illicit markets of cannabis and other related purposes.

== Farmers markets ==
In July 2023, New York State commenced new policies and rules on officially accepting applications regarding cannabis within farmers markets – by the Cannabis Control Board.

== New York City explicit local protections ==
In November 2023, the Governor of New York State signed into law a bill to explicitly legally protect New York City from overburdened business taxes at a state level – by "keeping cannabis regulations at a local autonomous issue" and providing needed relief to individuals and businesses within New York City local area enacted itself.
