= Senator Paul Simon Water for the World Act of 2009 =

The Senator Paul Simon Water for the World Act of 2009, also known as the Water for the World Act, is the name of two identical bills introduced in each house of the United States Congress. The Senate version was introduced March 17, 2009 in the 111th Congress by Dick Durbin (Illinois-D) to the United States Senate as S. 624. S. 624 has been cosponsored by 33 Senators. The House of Representatives version of the bill was introduced April 22, 2009 in the 111th Congress by Earl Blumenauer (Oregon-D) to the United States House of Representatives as H.R. 2030. HR. 2030 has been cosponsored by 99 Representatives.

The purpose of this bill is to provide 100,000,000 people with first-time access to safe drinking water and sanitation on a sustainable basis by 2015 by improving the capacity of the United States Government to fully implement the Senator Paul Simon Water for the Poor Act of 2005.

This bill has been endorsed by numerous humanitarian organizations including the ONE Campaign, CARE, and Mercy Corps.

== Provisions ==
Should this bill become law, it would require the Administrator of the United States Agency for International Development (USAID) to establish an Office of Water within the Bureau for Economic Growth, Agriculture, and Trade. It would also establish the position of Special Coordinator for International Waters; this person would report to the Under Secretary for Democracy and Global Affairs.

The Office of Water would be responsible for implementing legislation specific to water, such as the Water for the Poor Act of 2005. It would also develop and implement country-specific strategies. Its primary emphasis would be on providing safe, affordable, and sustainable drinking water, sanitation, and hygiene. This would be done in a manner that is consistent with sound water resource management principles and utilizes such approaches as direct service provision, capacity building, institutional strengthening, regulatory reform, and partnership collaboration.

== See also ==
- Poverty
- International Aid
- International Development
- Millennium Development Goals
