= New York Office of Cannabis Management =

U.S. state agency

Coordinates: 42°40′50″N 73°48′57″W

Office of Cannabis Management
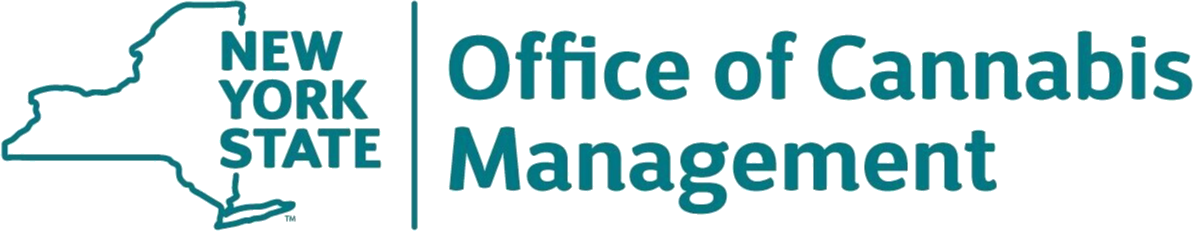

Regulatory agency overview
- Jurisdiction: New York State
- Regulatory agency executives: Felicia A.B. Reid, Executive Deputy Director, Acting Executive Director; Tremaine Wright, Chair of the Cannabis Control Board
- Parent division: Alcoholic Beverage Control
- Key documents: Marijuana Regulation and Taxation Act (MRTA) as enacted; Cannabis Law as amended
- Website: cannabis.ny.gov

The Office of Cannabis Management is a New York state government agency established upon passage of the Marijuana Regulation and Taxation Act (MRTA) to implement a regulatory framework for medical and adult-use cannabis in the state of New York, along with hemp regulations as well. It was announced by Governor Andrew Cuomo in the January 2019 State of the State address. The office is charged with the regulation and taxation of the cannabis industry in the State of New York, following the legalization of recreational cannabis which was signed into law by Governor Cuomo on March 31, 2021. Tax revenue taken in by the agency was estimated by the Governor to start at $83 million in 2021 and rise to $300 million at full implementation in 2023.

On September 1, 2021, Governor Kathy Hochul nominated Drug Policy Alliance policymaker Chris Alexander for Executive Director and Assemblywoman Tremaine Wright for Chair of the Cannabis Control Board. Both were confirmed by a Senate vote. The New York State Assembly and New York State Senate later appointed two other Cannabis Control Board members, Adam W. Perry and former state senator Jen Metzger, respectively.
