= David Joyce (politician) =

American politician (born 1957)

Dave Joyce
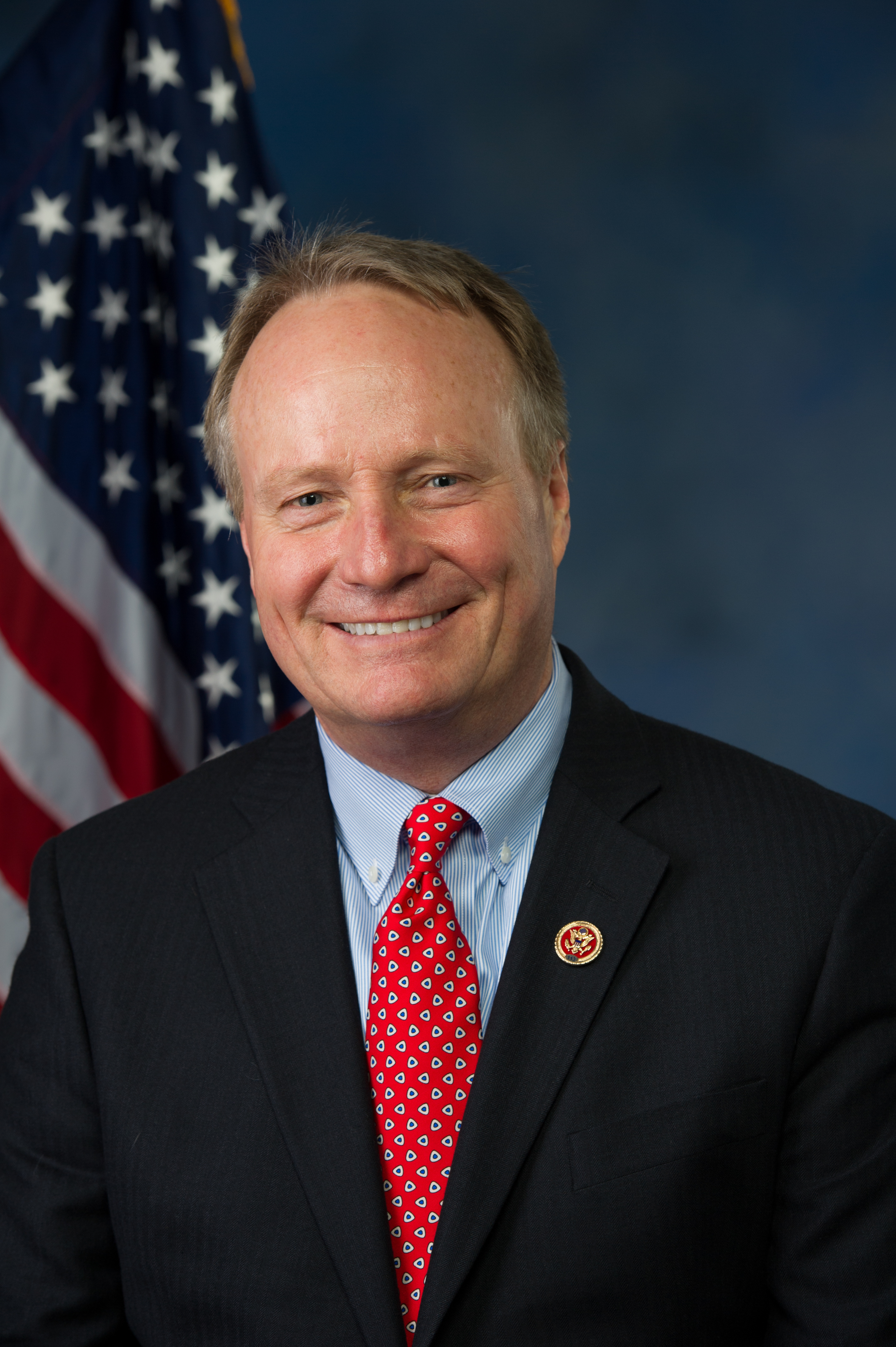
- Official portrait, 2013

Chair of the Republican Governance Group
- In office August 4, 2022 – January 3, 2025
- Preceded by: John Katko
- Succeeded by: David Valadao

Member of the U.S. House of Representatives from Ohio's 14th district
- Incumbent
- Assumed office January 3, 2013
- Preceded by: Steve LaTourette

39th Prosecutor of Geauga County
- In office January 5, 1988 – January 3, 2013
- Preceded by: Craig Albert
- Succeeded by: Jim Flaiz

Personal details
- Born: David Patrick Joyce; March 17, 1957 (age 69) Cleveland, Ohio, U.S.
- Party: Republican
- Spouse: Kelly Joyce (m. 1990)
- Children: 3
- Education: University of Dayton (BS, JD)
- Website: House website Campaign website
- Joyce's voice Joyce supporting the Title VIII Nursing Workforce Reauthorization Act of 2018; Recorded July 23, 2018

David Patrick Joyce (born March 17, 1957) is an American politician and attorney currently serving in the United States House of Representatives for Ohio's 14th congressional district since 2013. A member of the Republican Party, Joyce was previously the prosecutor of Geauga County, Ohio.

He chairs the Republican Governance Group, a group of moderate Republicans in the United States House of Representatives.

== Early life and education ==
Joyce was born in Cleveland, Ohio, to an Irish Catholic family. His father was a coal salesman. In high school, he played football, and considered joining the priesthood. In 1975, Joyce enrolled at the University of Dayton, a Catholic university, from which he received a Bachelor of Science degree in accounting in 1979, and later his Juris Doctor.

== Legal career ==
From 1983 to 1984, Joyce was a public defender for Cuyahoga County, and from 1985 to 1988 a public defender for Geauga County. In 1989, he was hired as an assistant county attorney in Lake County. He assisted County Prosecutor Steven C. LaTourette in prosecuting serial murderer and cult leader Jeffrey Lundgren for the Kirtland cult killings.

By 2012, Joyce had been appointed prosecutor of Geauga County. He prosecuted the 2012 Chardon High School shooting of six students that took place on February 27, 2012. The defendant, Thomas "T.J." Lane, 17 years old at the time of the crime, was charged as an adult with three counts of aggravated murder, two counts of aggravated attempted murder, and one count of felonious assault. He pleaded guilty and was sentenced in 2013 to three life sentences without parole.

== U.S. House of Representatives ==
=== Elections ===
==== 2012 ====
In July 2012, Representative Steve LaTourette of Ohio's 14th congressional district announced that he would retire in 2012 rather than seek reelection. Because LaTourette announced his retirement after the primary, local Republican party leaders chose Joyce as the replacement nominee.

Joyce ran in the November general election against Democratic nominee Dale Virgil Blanchard, Libertarian David Macko and Green Party nominee Elaine Mastromatteo. He won with 54% of the vote.

==== 2014 ====
In February 2013, Roll Call reported that Steve Israel, head of the Democratic Congressional Campaign Committee, had identified the 14th congressional district as one of the party's top four targets in 2014. The House Majority PAC made Joyce one of its top targets to oust in the 2014 elections.

In 2014, according to one news source, Joyce "survived a grueling primary against a Tea Party-backed candidate" before facing "an equally tough challenge from Michael Wager." Joyce won with 63.3% of the vote to Wager's 33% and independent David Macko's 3.7%.

==== 2016 ====
Joyce defeated Wager again, 62.6% to 37.4%.

==== 2018 ====
In April 2017, Betsy Rader, a Democrat, announced that she would run against Joyce in 2018. She is a lawyer who represents victims of employment discrimination. Rader said she supported "much" of the Affordable Care Act, but that she needed to study health care more as an issue. She criticized Joyce for opposing an increase in the minimum wage and for wanting to defund Planned Parenthood.

In October 2017, Darrell Scott, a pastor involved in President Donald Trump's political operation, and who served as CEO of the semi-official "National Diversity Coalition for Trump" organized by Trump's attorney Michael Cohen, said he would consider a primary challenge to Joyce.

==== 2024 ====
On June 12, 2024, Joyce was the only Republican to vote against holding Attorney General Merrick Garland in contempt for refusing to release audiotapes of President Biden's interview regarding classified documents. The vote on the GOP-led measure was 216 to 207. He said he couldn't support a "resolution that would further politicize our judicial system to score political points".

=== Tenure ===
Asked about his legislative priorities in March 2016, Joyce cited terrorist threats, job growth, government spending, the national debt, environmental protection of the Great Lakes, and health care.

The Lugar Center and the McCourt School of Public Policy ranked Joyce the 29th most bipartisan member of the House of Representatives during the 114th United States Congress and the most bipartisan member of the House from Ohio.

In July 2017, Joyce said that U.S. political discourse had reached a "vitriolic" level. "I do know there's a level of frustration out there," he said. "But we need to work together. [President Donald Trump] has gotten into this tug-of-war with the national media. Now we're six months into his presidency ... and infrastructure improvements, tax changes and healthcare law are not getting covered. They are dealing with the tweet du Jour ... and [Trump's tweets] certainly don't help."

Joyce is a member of the Republican Main Street Partnership, United States Congressional International Conservation Caucus, Veterinary Medicine Caucus, and the Climate Solutions Caucus. He co-chairs the Congressional Cannabis Caucus.

During Donald Trump's presidency, Joyce voted in line with Trump's stated position 91.8% of the time. As of September 2021, Joyce had voted in line with Joe Biden's stated position 30.6% of the time.

On July 29, 2024, Joyce was announced as one of seven Republican members of a bipartisan task force investigating the attempted assassination of Donald Trump.

=== Committee assignments ===
- Committee on Appropriations
  - Subcommittee on Interior, Environment, and Related Agencies (Ranking Member, 116th &117th Congress)
  - Subcommittee on Financial Services and General Government
  - Subcommittee on Homeland Security (Chair, 118th Congress)
- Committee on Ethics
- Select Committee on the Modernization of Congress

=== Caucus memberships ===
- Rare Disease Caucus
- Republican Study Committee
- Republican Governance Group
- Republican Main Street Partnership
- United States Congressional International Conservation Caucus
- Veterinary Medicine Caucus
- Climate Solutions Caucus
- Congressional Cannabis Caucus (Co-Chair)
- Problem Solvers Caucus
- Congressional Coalition on Adoption
- Congressional Taiwan Caucus
- Congressional Ukraine Caucus
- Congressional Wildlife Refuge Caucus

== Political positions ==
=== Health care ===
Joyce opposes the Affordable Care Act (Obamacare) and has voted 31 times to repeal it. In 2017, he voted against a Republican bill to repeal the Affordable Care Act, saying it "was too partisan".

=== Jobs ===
In August 2013, Joyce said that part of the problem with unemployment numbers in the U.S. is that employers "can't find people to come to work sober, daily, drug-free and want to learn the necessary skills going forward to be able to do those jobs."

=== Immigration ===
In March 2016, Joyce said that he had co-sponsored "several bills that ensured refugees underwent stricter scrutiny in order to prevent a Paris-style attack from happening in the United States." He supports the Visa Waiver Program in order to "ensure terrorists with Western passports don't enter our country," for restrictions on transferring Guantanamo detainees, and for enhancements in cybersecurity infrastructure. He said, in summary, that he was "committed to giving our soldiers and our intelligence community all of the resources they need to do the job."

Joyce voted for the Further Consolidated Appropriations Act of 2020 which authorizes DHS to nearly double the available H-2B visas for the remainder of FY 2020.

Joyce voted for the Consolidated Appropriations Act (H.R. 1158), which effectively prohibits ICE from cooperating with Health and Human Services to detain or remove illegal alien sponsors of unaccompanied alien children (UACs).

=== Transportation ===
In 2014, Joyce introduced the Safe Streets Act with Congresswoman Doris Matsui. The bill would nationalize transportation "design elements" so that streets would be designed with the safety of drivers, pedestrians, and bicyclists in mind.

=== Cannabis ===
Joyce has supported a number of congressional efforts to reform cannabis laws. He reintroduced the Rohrabacher–Farr amendment in 2018 to prohibit the Justice Department from spending funds to interfere with the implementation of state medical cannabis laws. He also introduced the STATES Act in 2018 and 2019 to protect states from federal interference regarding both medical and recreational use. Also in 2018, Joyce cosponsored the Ending Federal Marijuana Prohibition Act. In January 2019, he was named a co-chair of the Congressional Cannabis Caucus.

In 2021, Joyce introduced the Veterans Medical Marijuana Safe Harbor Act to legalize medical cannabis for military veterans and allow Veterans Affairs doctors to prescribe the drug. Also in 2021, he introduced the Cannabis Reform for Veterans, Small Businesses, and Medical Professionals Act to remove cannabis from the Controlled Substances Act and direct federal agencies to develop regulations for cannabis similar to alcohol. Later in 2021, he and Representative Alexandria Ocasio-Cortez introduced the Harnessing Opportunities by Pursuing Expungement (HOPE) Act to provide grants for state and local governments to expunge cannabis offenses. Joyce endorsed Ohio Issue 2 in 2023 which legalized cannabis for recreational use in his home state.

=== Impeachments of Donald Trump ===
Joyce voted "no" on the first impeachment of Donald Trump on charges of abuse of power and obstruction of Congress on December 18, 2019. On January 13, 2021, he voted against Trump's second impeachment for incitement of insurrection.

=== January 6 commission ===
On May 19, 2021, Joyce was one of 35 Republicans who joined all Democrats in voting to approve legislation to establish the January 6 commission meant to investigate the storming of the U.S. Capitol.

=== Censure of Paul Gosar ===
In November 2021, Joyce refused to vote to censure Paul Gosar, a House member who approvingly shared an anime video of himself killing a fellow member and assaulting the president. Joyce voted "Present."

=== LGBTQ rights ===
On July 19, 2022, Joyce and 46 other Republican representatives voted for the Respect for Marriage Act, which would codify the right to same-sex marriage in federal law.

=== Suspending the US Constitution ===
In a nationally broadcast December 2022 interview, Joyce said that, regardless of Donald Trump's calls to suspend the Constitution of the United States, he would support him for president were Trump to win the Republican nomination in 2024.

=== SANEs Act ===
In February 2022, Joyce and Representative Deborah Ross introduced the Sexual Assault Nurse Examiners (SANEs) Act, which is designed to address the nationwide shortage of Sexual Assault Nurse Examiners and improve care for survivors of sexual violence. The bill was endorsed by RAINN, the American Nurses Association, and the National Network to End Domestic Violence.

== Personal life ==
Joyce married Kelly in 1990. They live in Russell Township with their three children. Joyce is a member of the National District Attorney Association and the Ohio Prosecuting Attorney Association. He is also director of Geauga Bluecoats Inc. He is Catholic.

== Electoral history ==
Election results
Year	Office	Election	Candidate	Party	Votes	%
2012 (Note: Write-in candidates Aaron Zurbrugg received 6 votes (<1%), Erick Robinson received 0 votes, and Steven Winfield received 0 votes.)	U.S. House of Representatives	General	Dave Joyce	Republican	183,660	54%
2012	U.S. House of Representatives	General	Dale V. Blanchard	Democratic	131,638	38.7%
2012	U.S. House of Representatives	General	Elaine Mastromatteo	Green	13,038	3.8%
2012	U.S. House of Representatives	General	David Macko	Libertarian	11,536	3.4%
2014 (Note: Write-in candidates received 171 votes (<1%))	U.S. House of Representatives	General	Dave Joyce	Republican	135,736	63.3%
2014	U.S. House of Representatives	General	Michael Wager	Democratic	70,856	33%
2014	U.S. House of Representatives	General	David Macko	Libertarian	7,988	3.7%
2016	U.S. House of Representatives	General	Dave Joyce	Republican	219,191	62.6%
2016	U.S. House of Representatives	General	Michael Wager	Democratic	130,907	37.4%
2018	U.S. House of Representatives	General	Dave Joyce	Republican	169,809	55.2%
2018	U.S. House of Representatives	General	Betsy Rader	Democratic	137,549	44.8%
2020	U.S. House of Representatives	General	Dave Joyce	Republican	238,864	60.1%
2020	U.S. House of Representatives	General	Hillary Mueri	Democratic	158,586	39.9%
2022	U.S. House of Representatives	General	Dave Joyce	Republican	183,389	61.7%
2022	U.S. House of Representatives	General	Matt Kilboy	Democratic	113,639	38.3%
2024	U.S. House Of Representatives	General	Dave Joyce	Republican	243,427	63.4%
2024	U.S. House Of Representatives	General	Brian Bob Kenderes	Democratic	140,431	36.6%

U.S. House of Representatives
Preceded by Steve LaTourette	Member of the U.S. House of Representatives from Ohio's 14th congressional district 2013–present	Incumbent
Party political offices
Preceded by John Katko	Chair of the Republican Governance Group; 2022–2025	Succeeded by David Valadao
U.S. order of precedence (ceremonial)
Preceded by Hakeem Jeffries	United States representatives by seniority 107th	Succeeded by Grace Meng
