= New York Cannabis Regulation and Taxation Act =

2021 proposed law in New York State

The Cannabis Regulation and Taxation Act was a bill under consideration by the New York State Legislature during the 2020-2021 session to legalize cannabis. It was contained in Part H of the revenue bills embodying Governor Andrew Cuomo's budget proposal, A3009 and S2509.

Legislation to legalize marijuana in the 2021 session was ultimately approved independent of the budget process as the Marijuana Regulation and Taxation Act.

== History ==
Cannabis possession was decriminalized in New York in 2019 but without any framework for regulated sales or legal possession. The Marijuana Regulation and Taxation Act, a 2019 bill that would have legalized cannabis in the state (and prior bills as early as 2013), failed.

The Cannabis Regulation and Taxation Act was proposed by the governor on January 19, 2021 as part of the state budget. State senator Liz Krueger had pre-filed a competing bill on January 6, the "Marihuana Regulation and Taxation Act", that would also legalize cannabis in the state.

== Provisions, revenue and administration ==
The act creates the Office of Cannabis Management (OCM) within the Division of Alcohol Beverage Control, a licensing regime with social equity provisions, and legalizes cannabis for adult use.

Tax revenue under the act for the state is estimated in the governor's budget proposal to be at least $350 million annually.

== Support and opposition ==
The president of Monroe County Police Chiefs Association said that under the proposed regulatory regime, illegal, unregulated sales would increase because "[unregulated] marijuana is cheaper than going to the state’s marijuana dispensary".

== See also ==
- List of 2021 United States cannabis reform proposals
- La Guardia Committee
