= Earl Blumenauer =

American politician (born 1948)

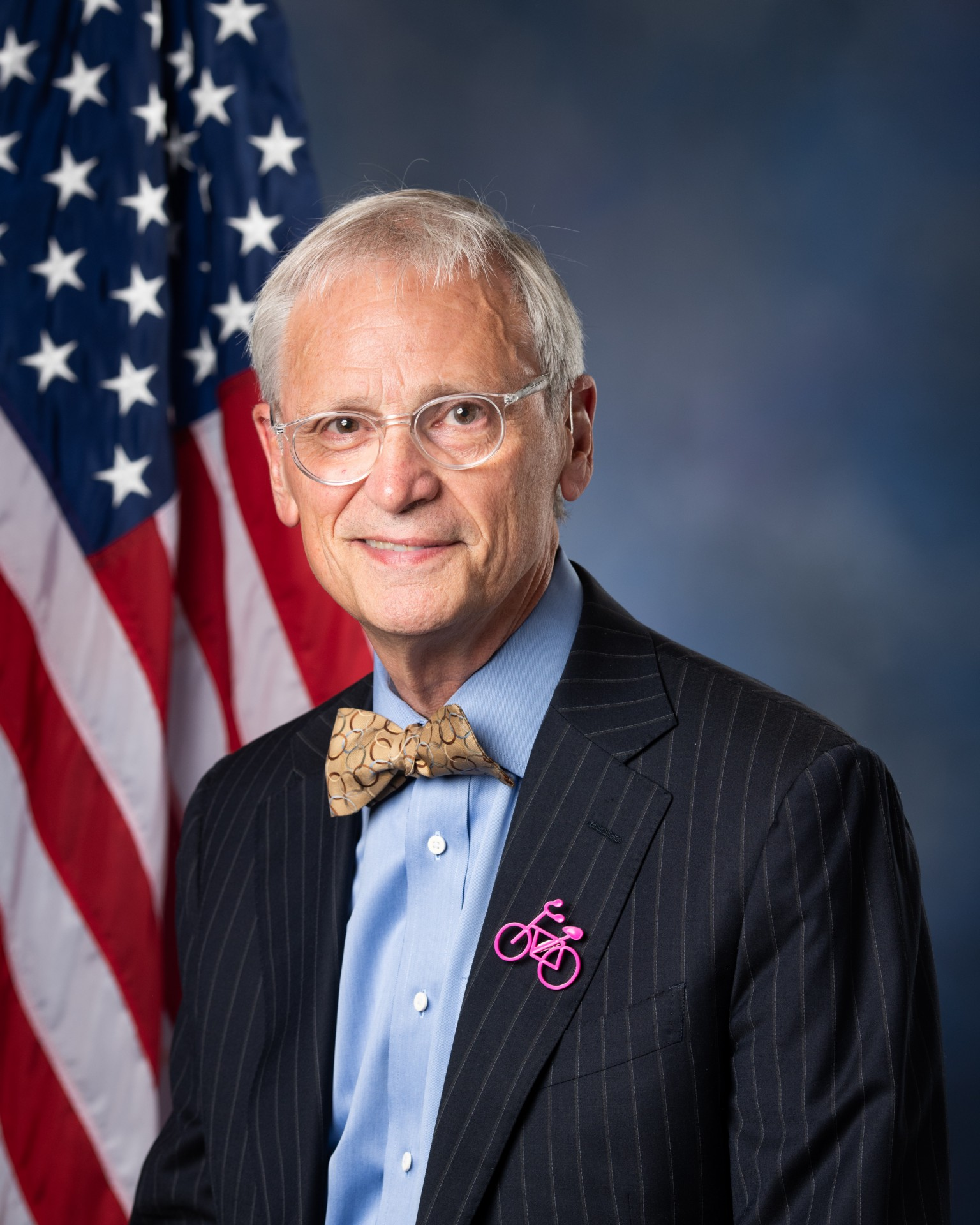
- Official portrait, 2019

Member of the U.S. House of Representatives from Oregon's 3rd district
- In office May 21, 1996 – January 3, 2025 (Note: Blumenauer's official service begins on the date of the special election, while he was not sworn in until May 30, 1996.)
- Preceded by: Ron Wyden
- Succeeded by: Maxine Dexter

Portland City Commissioner
- In office January 5, 1987 – May 25, 1996
- Preceded by: Mildred Schwab
- Succeeded by: Erik Sten

Member of the Multnomah County Board of Commissioners
- In office January 1979 – January 1987

Member of the Oregon House of Representatives from the 11th district
- In office January 8, 1973 – January 1, 1979
- Preceded by: John W. Anunsen
- Succeeded by: Rick Bauman

Personal details
- Born: Earl Francis Blumenauer; August 16, 1948 (age 78) Portland, Oregon, U.S.
- Party: Democratic
- Spouse: Margaret Kirkpatrick (m. 2004)
- Children: 2
- Education: Lewis and Clark College (BA, JD)
- Website: House website
- Blumenauer's voice Blumenauer on transportation and infrastructure funding. Recorded November 19, 2013

Earl Francis Blumenauer (/ˈbluːmənaʊ.ər/ BLOOM-ə-nowər; born August 16, 1948) is an American lawyer, author, and politician who served as the U.S. representative for Oregon's 3rd congressional district from 1996 to 2025. The district includes most of Portland east of the Willamette River.

As a member of the Democratic Party, Blumenauer previously spent over 20 years as a public official in Portland, including serving on the Portland City Council from 1987 to 1996, when he succeeded Ron Wyden in the U.S. House of Representatives. Wyden was elected to the U.S. Senate after Bob Packwood resigned.

Blumenauer is known for his distinctive bow ties and neon bicycle lapel pins. He gifts his signature bike pins to fellow congressmen, interns, and staffers.

Since January 2025, Blumenauer serves as a senior fellow at Portland State University and as special advisor to university president Ann Cudd.

== Early life and education ==
Blumenauer was born in Portland on August 16, 1948. In 1966, he graduated from Centennial High School on Portland's east side and then enrolled at Lewis & Clark College. He majored in political science and received a Bachelor of Arts degree from Lewis & Clark in 1970. Blumenauer completed his education in 1976 when he earned a Juris Doctor degree from the school's Northwestern School of Law (now Lewis & Clark Law School). Before starting law school in 1970 and until 1977, he worked as an assistant to the president of Portland State University.

== Early political career ==
In 1969–70, Blumenauer organized and led Oregon's "Go 19" campaign, an effort to lower the state voting age (while then unsuccessful, it supported the national trend that soon resulted in the Twenty-sixth Amendment to the United States Constitution, which lowered the voting age to 18). In 1972, he was elected to the Oregon House of Representatives, representing the 11th district in Multnomah County. He was reelected in 1974 and 1976, and continued representing Portland and Multnomah County until the 1979 legislative session. From 1975 to 1981 he served on the board of Portland Community College. After his time in the Oregon legislature, he served on the Multnomah County Commission from 1979 to 1986. He lost a race for Portland City Council to Margaret Strachan in 1981. He left the county commission in March 1986 to run again for city council.

Blumenauer was elected to the Portland City Council in May 1986. His first term began in January 1987, and he remained on the council until 1996. From the start of his first term, he was named the city's Commissioner of Public Works, which made him the council member in charge of the Portland Bureau of Transportation (also known as the Transportation Commissioner). During his time on the council, Blumenauer was appointed by Oregon Governor Neil Goldschmidt to the state's commission on higher education, on which he served in 1990 and 1991. In 1992, Blumenauer was defeated by Vera Katz in an open race for mayor of Portland—to date, only the second time that Blumenauer has lost an election. At the time he was called "the man who probably knows the most about how Portland works", but he left local politics to run for Congress. After winning election to Congress, he resigned from the city council in May 1996. In 2010, Blumenauer received The Ralph Lowell Award for outstanding contributions to public television.

== U.S. House of Representatives ==
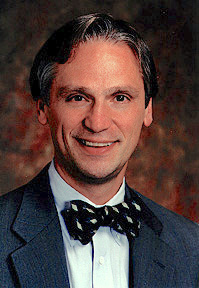
Blumenauer during the 105th Congress

=== Tenure ===
Blumenauer was elected to the United States House of Representatives in 1996 in a special election to fill the vacancy caused by the election of Ron Wyden to the U.S. Senate. He received 69% of the vote, defeating Republican Mark Brunelle. He was elected to a full term that November, and was reelected 10 times without serious difficulty in what has long been Oregon's most Democratic district, never with less than 66% of the vote.

Blumenauer served as Oregon campaign chair for both John Kerry's and Barack Obama's presidential campaigns.

In Congress, Blumenauer is noted for his advocacy for mass transit, such as Portland's MAX Light Rail and the Portland Streetcar, and, as a strong supporter of legislation promoting bicycle commuting, cycles from his Washington residence to the Capitol and even to the White House for meetings.

Among the bills Blumenauer has sponsored that have become law are the Bunning-Bereuter-Blumenauer Flood Insurance Reform Act of 2004 and the Senator Paul Simon Water for the Poor Act of 2005. In addition, the Legal Timber Protection Act passed as part of the 2008 Farm Bill, while the Bicycle Commuter Act passed with the 2008 bailout bill.

Blumenauer was active in pressuring the United States to take greater action during the Darfur conflict.

In the political aftermath of Hurricane Katrina, Blumenauer noted that he was among those who had pointed out the vulnerability of New Orleans and encouraged Congress to help that city and the gulf coast get better prepared:

- 2004: "Barely have we recovered from Hurricane Hugo and we are seeing Hurricane Ivan pose the threat that has long been feared by those in Louisiana, that this actually might represent the loss of the City of New Orleans. Located 15 feet below sea level, there is the potential of a 30-foot wall of water putting at risk $100 billion of infrastructure and industry and countless lives."
- 2005: "I recently had the opportunity to view the devastation in Southeast Asia as a result of the tsunami. As appalled as I was by what I saw, I must confess that occasionally my thoughts drifted back to the United States. What would have happened if last September, Hurricane Ivan had veered 40 miles to the west, devastating the city of New Orleans? One likely scenario would have had a tsunami-like 30-foot wall of water hitting the city, causing thousands of deaths and $100 billion in damage...The experience of Southeast Asia should convince us all of the urgent need for congressional action to prevent wide-scale loss of life and economic destruction at home and abroad. Prevention and planning will pay off. Maybe the devastation will encourage us to act before disaster strikes."

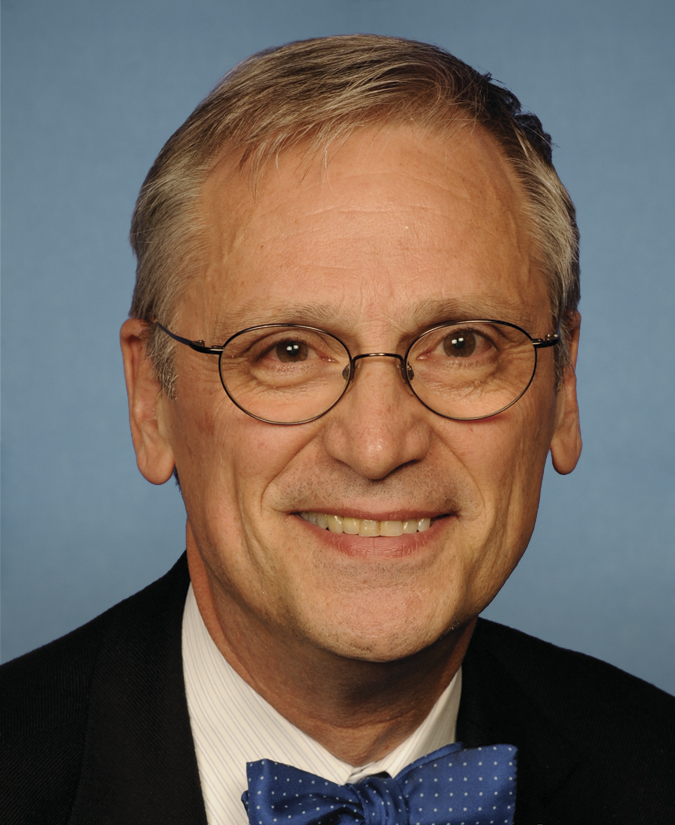
Blumenauer during the 112th Congress

Blumenauer supports the World Trade Organization and has voted for free trade agreements with Peru, Australia, Singapore, Chile, Africa, and the Caribbean. His support for these agreements has angered progressives, environmental and labor activists. In 2004, he voted against the Central America Free Trade Agreement. On September 24, 2007, four labor and human rights activists were arrested in Blumenauer's office protesting his support for the Peru Free Trade Agreement.

Blumenauer received some media attention during the political debate over health care reform for sponsoring an amendment to the America's Affordable Health Choices Act of 2009 to change procedures to mandate that Medicare pay for end-of-life counseling. The amendment, as introduced, was based on an earlier proposal cosponsored by Blumenauer and Republican Representative Charles Boustany of Louisiana. The amendment generated controversy, with conservative figures, such as 2008 vice presidential nominee and former Alaska governor Sarah Palin, suggesting that the amendment, if made law, would be used as a cover for the federal government to set up "death panels" that would be used to determine which people received medical treatment. Blumenauer called the claim "mind-numbing" and an "all-time low." His rebuke was echoed by Republican Senator Johnny Isakson of Georgia, who called the death panels claim "nuts."

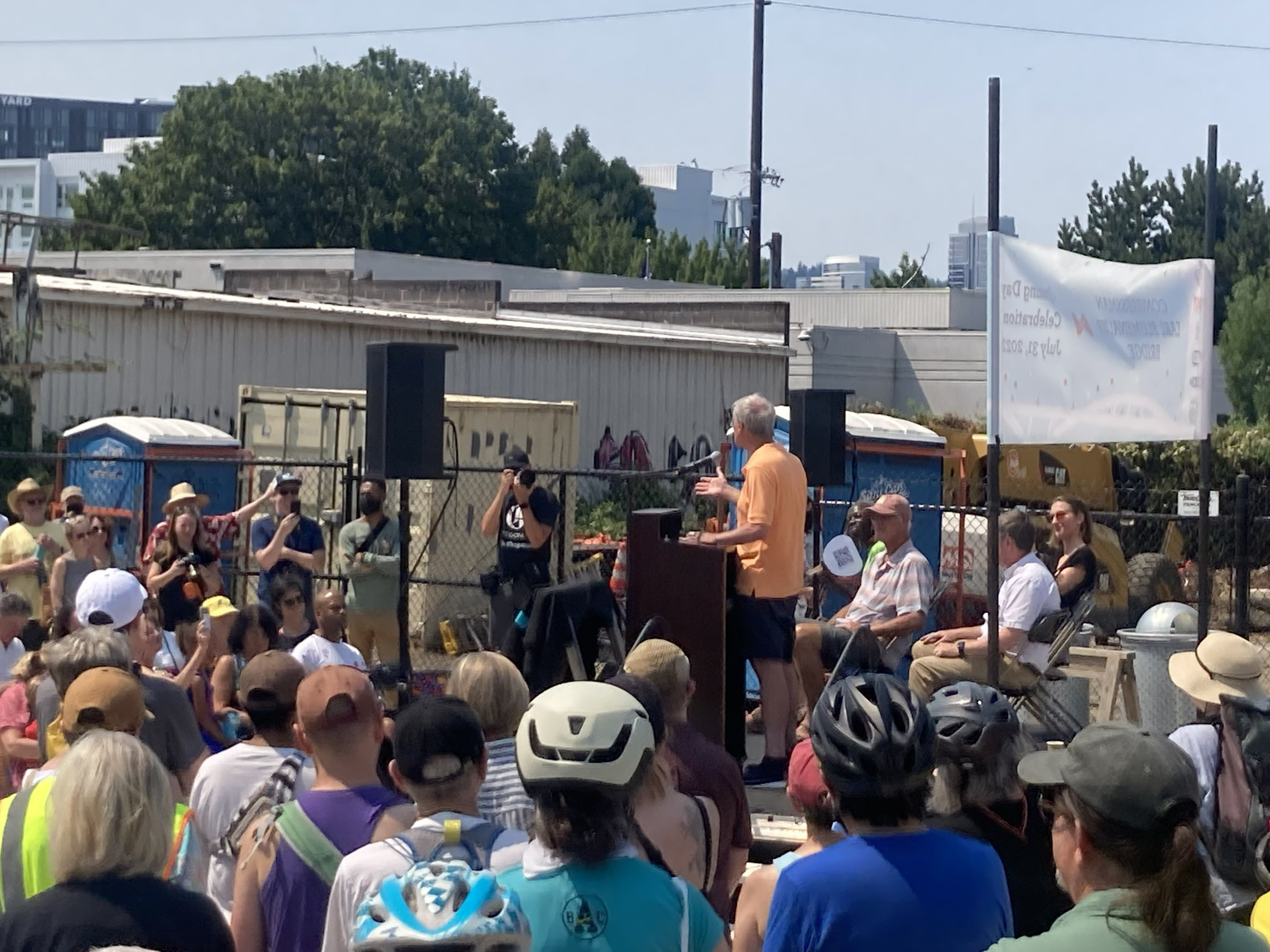
Blumenauer speaks at the opening ceremony for his namesake bike and pedestrian bridge in Portland, Oregon

On July 24, 2014, Blumenauer introduced the Emergency Afghan Allies Extension Act of 2014 (H.R. 5195; 113th Congress), a bill that would authorize an additional 1,000 emergency Special Immigrant Visas that the United States Department of State could issue to Afghan translators who served with U.S. troops during the War in Afghanistan. He argued that "a failure to provide these additional visas ensures the many brave translators the U.S. promised to protect in exchange for their services would be left in Afghanistan, hiding, their lives still threatened daily by the Taliban."

Blumenauer skipped all of President Trump's State of the Union addresses, saying, "I refuse to be a witness to his continued antics." In 2019 he was one of the first lawmakers to come out in support of the Green New Deal.

In July 2019, Blumenauer voted against a House resolution introduced by Representative Brad Schneider opposing efforts to boycott the State of Israel and the Boycott, Divestment, and Sanctions Movement. The resolution passed 398–17.

In November 2020, Blumenauer was named a candidate for Secretary of Transportation in the incoming Biden administration. Pete Buttigieg was eventually chosen instead.

During the 117th Congress, Blumenauer voted with President Joe Biden's stated position 99.1% of the time according to a FiveThirtyEight analysis.

Blumenauer voted to provide Israel with support following the October 7 attacks.

On October 30, 2023, Blumenauer announced he would not run for re-election in 2024.

On July 10, 2024, Blumenauer called for Joe Biden to withdraw from the 2024 United States presidential election.

=== Committee assignments ===
- Committee on Ways and Means
  - Subcommittee on Health

=== Caucus memberships ===
- Congressional Progressive Caucus
- Congressional Cannabis Caucus
- Renewable Energy and Energy Efficiency Caucus
- Sustainable Energy and Environment Coalition
- National Guard and Reserve Component Caucus
- Animal Protection Caucus
- Historic Preservation Caucus
- International Conservation Caucus
- Congressional Coalition on Adoption
- Fitness Caucus
- Bosnia Caucus
- Korea Caucus
- Diabetes Caucus
- Congressional Bike Caucus
- Caucus to Control and Fight Methamphetamine
- Human Rights Commission
- House Oceans Caucus
- Internet Caucus
- Congressional Asian and Pacific American Caucus
- Dem Caucus Congressional Taskforce on Seniors
- Wild Salmon Caucus
- High Performance Building
- Congressional Human Trafficking Caucus
- Congressional Land Conservation Caucus
- Urban Caucus
- Wine Caucus
- Small Brewers Caucus
- Quality Care Caucus
- Congressional Arts Caucus
- United States Congressional International Conservation Caucus
- Climate Solutions Caucus
- U.S.-Japan Caucus
- Medicare for All Caucus
- Congressional Caucus for the Equal Rights Amendment

== Post-congress ==
On September 10, 2024, Portland State University announced that following his term, Blumenauer would be joining the faculty as a senior fellow and as special advisor to University President Ann Cudd. He also serves as a Presidential Fellow of the Institute of Portland Metropolitan Studies. Blumenauer began his role on January 3, 2025.

== Political positions ==
In 1996, Blumenauer's first year in Congress, he voted in support of the Defense of Marriage Act, which passed that year. The law was found unconstitutional in 2013 and repealed. Since then he has supported LGBTQ rights.

On October 1, 2015, following the Umpqua Community College shooting, Blumenauer tweeted his report addressing the issue of gun violence in America, Enough is Enough: A Comprehensive Plan to Improve Gun Safety, which he had published earlier that year.

Blumenauer has supported alternative energy sources, health care reform, and continuing federal support for education. He is also known as one of the most fervent advocates for the legalization of marijuana, co-founding the Congressional Cannabis Caucus. He was the chief sponsor of a bill to expand the research of medical cannabis and its drug derivatives that passed the House in July 2022 and the Senate in November.

=== Agriculture ===
Blumenauer is a longtime advocate of agricultural and food system reform. He repeatedly introduced legislation that would have overhauled U.S. agricultural policy, including provisions that would have imposed restrictions on farm subsidies to concentrated animal feeding operations (CAFOs) and livestock feed producers, increased support for smaller-scale farmers, and imposed environmental and welfare standards on large animal agriculture operations.

Blumenauer supports increasing federal funding for alternative proteins, including plant-based and cultivated meat. In April 2021, he led a letter by 20 members of Congress requesting $100 million in funding for alternative proteins research and development. In response to a proposal by The Good Food Institute that the Biden administration include $2 billion in alternative proteins funding in the Build Back Better Plan, Blumenauer told New York Times columnist Ezra Klein: "I've never seen anything like this in terms of the volume of money being talked about and the opportunities to do something transformational. It wouldn't take a lot of investment in alternative protein to take it to a whole different level."

=== Animal welfare ===
Blumenauer was a co-chair of the Congressional Animal Protection Caucus and supports strong legal protections for animal welfare. In August 2023, he led a bipartisan letter by more than 150 representatives opposing the inclusion of language in the 2023 farm bill that would have invalidated state and local laws regulating animal confinement practices, including restrictions on the sale of goods produced in battery cages, gestation crates, and veal crates. Blumenauer's farm bill proposal would have established nationwide protections for farm animal welfare and eliminated subsidies to intensive animal farming operations.

In February 2009, after a domesticated chimpanzee in Connecticut severely mauled a woman, gaining national attention, Blumenauer sponsored the Captive Primate Safety Act to bar the sale or purchase of non-human primates for personal possession between states and from outside the country. He reintroduced the legislation in 2024. In June 2008, Blumenauer had sponsored legislation to ban interstate trafficking of great apes, which passed the House but was tabled by the Senate.

== Personal life ==
Blumenauer has been married to Margaret Kirkpatrick since 2004.

An avid cyclist, Blumenauer is the founder and was co-chair of the Congressional Bike Caucus.

Each year, in the weeks leading up to Christmas, Blumenauer bakes and delivers hundreds of fruitcakes to his colleagues on the Hill.

== Electoral history ==
Oregon's 3rd congressional district: Results 1996–2022
Year	Democratic	Votes	Pct	Republican	Votes	Pct	3rd Party	Party	Votes	Pct	3rd Party	Party	Votes	Pct	3rd Party	Party	Votes	Pct	
1996	Earl Blumenauer	165,922	67%	Scott Bruun	65,259	26%	Joe Keating	Pacific	9,274	4%	Bruce A. Knight	Libertarian	4,474	2%	Victoria P. Guillebeau	Socialist	2,449	1%	*
1998	Earl Blumenauer	153,889	84%	(no candidate)			Bruce A. Knight	Libertarian	16,930	9%	Walt Brown	Socialist	10,199	6%	Write-ins		2,333	1%	
2000	Earl Blumenauer	181,049	67%	Jeffery L. Pollock	64,128	24%	Tre Arrow	Pacific Green	15,763	6%	Bruce A. Knight	Libertarian	4,942	2%	Walt Brown	Socialist	4,703	2%	*
2002	Earl Blumenauer	156,851	67%	Sarah Seale	62,821	27%	Walt Brown	Socialist	6,588	3%	Kevin Jones	Libertarian	4,704	2%	David Brownlow	Constitution	3,495	1%	*
2004	Earl Blumenauer	245,559	71%	Tami Mars	82,045	24%	Walt Brown	Socialist	10,678	3%	Dale Winegarden	Constitution	7,119	2%	Write-ins		1,159	<1%	
2006	Earl Blumenauer	186,380	73%	Bruce Broussard	59,529	23%	David Brownlow	Constitution	7,003	3%	Write-ins		698	<1%					
2008	Earl Blumenauer	254,235	75%	Delia Lopez	71,063	21%	Michael Meo	Pacific Green	15,063	4%	Write-ins		701	<1%					
2010	Earl Blumenauer	193,104	70%	Delia Lopez	67,714	25%	Jeff Lawrence	Libertarian	8,380	3%	Michael Meo	Pacific Green	6,197	2%	Write-ins		407	<1%	
2012	Earl Blumenauer	264,979	74%	Ronald Green	70,325	20%	Woodrow Broadnax	Pacific Green	13,159	4%	Michael Meo	Libertarian	6,640	2%	Write-ins		772	<1%	
2014	Earl Blumenauer	211,748	72%	James Buchal	57,424	20%	Michael Meo	Pacific Green	12,106	4%	Jeffrey J. Langan	Libertarian	6,381	2%	David Walker	Non-affiliated	1,089	1%	*
2016	Earl Blumenauer	274,687	72%	No candidate			David W. Walker	Independent	78,154	20%	David Delk	Progressive	27,978	7%	Write-ins		1,536	<1%	
2018	Earl Blumenauer	279,019	73%	Tom Harrison	76,187	20%	Marc Koller	Independent	21,352	6%	Gary Dye	Libertarian	5,767	2%	Michael Marsh	Constitution	1,487	<1%	*
2020	Earl Blumenauer	343,574	73%	Joanna Harbour	110,570	24%	Alex DiBlasi	Pacific Green	8,872	2%	Josh Solomon	Libertarian	6,869	2%	Write-ins		621	<1%	
2022	Earl Blumenauer	212,119	69%	Joanna Harbour	79,766	26%	David E Delk	Pacific Green	10,982	3%	Write-ins		467	<1%					

Write-in and minor candidate notes: In 1996, write-ins received 531 votes. In 2000, write-ins received 576 votes. In 2002, write-ins received 1094 votes. In 2014, write-ins received 1,089 votes. In 2018, write-ins received 514 votes.

== See also ==
- Blumenauer Bridge

U.S. House of Representatives
Preceded by Ron Wyden	Member of the U.S. House of Representatives from Oregon's 3rd congressional district 1996–2025	Succeeded by Maxine Dexter
U.S. order of precedence (ceremonial)
Preceded by Duncan L. Hunter as Former U.S. Representative	Order of precedence of the United States as Former U.S. Representative	Succeeded by Alan Mollohan as Former U.S. Representative
