= Congressional Cannabis Caucus =

Caucus in the United States Congress

- Founded: 2017
- Ideology: States' rights Cannabis reform
- Seats in the House Democratic Caucus: 2 / 222
- Seats in the House Republican Caucus: 2 / 210
- Seats in the House: 4 / 435

The Congressional Cannabis Caucus is a registered caucus in the United States Congress, formed in 2017 during the 115th session. The bipartisan caucus was founded by Republicans Dana Rohrabacher and Don Young and Democrats Earl Blumenauer and Jared Polis. The Congressional Cannabis Caucus seeks to harmonize federal laws that conflict with various state laws that permit medical and recreational cannabis.

== Background ==
Dana Rohrabacher, a Republican member of the United States House of Representatives from California, coauthored the Rohrabacher–Farr amendment, which was passed by the 113th United States Congress in 2014. The amendment prevented the United States Department of Justice from using its funding to challenge states that have approved medical cannabis laws. Meanwhile, Earl Blumenauer, a member of House of Representatives from Oregon in the Democratic Party, supported Oregon Ballot Measure 91 in 2014, legalizing recreational cannabis in Oregon. Rohrabacher endorsed the Adult Use of Marijuana Act, which legalized recreational cannabis in California in 2016, and acknowledged using medical cannabis to treat his arthritis.

In 2016, Blumenauer and Rohrabacher agreed to form a congressional caucus to streamline cannabis reform legislation at the federal level, considering it a states' rights issue. In February 2017, Rohrabacher and Blumenauer launched the caucus with Jared Polis, a Democrat from Colorado, and Don Young, a Republican from Alaska. The caucus intends to increase medical research into cannabis and change regulations on banking and taxation for cannabis businesses.

In the 116th Congress, Rohrbacher and Polis left Congress and were replaced by Barbara Lee, a Democrat from California, and David Joyce, a Republican from Ohio, as co-chairs. After Don Young died in office in 2022, he was replaced by Brian Mast of Florida.

In January 2025, it was announced that Reps. Dina Titus (D-NV) and Ilhan Omar (D-MN) would serve as Caucus co-chairs, replacing Reps. Blumenauer and Lee.

== Members ==
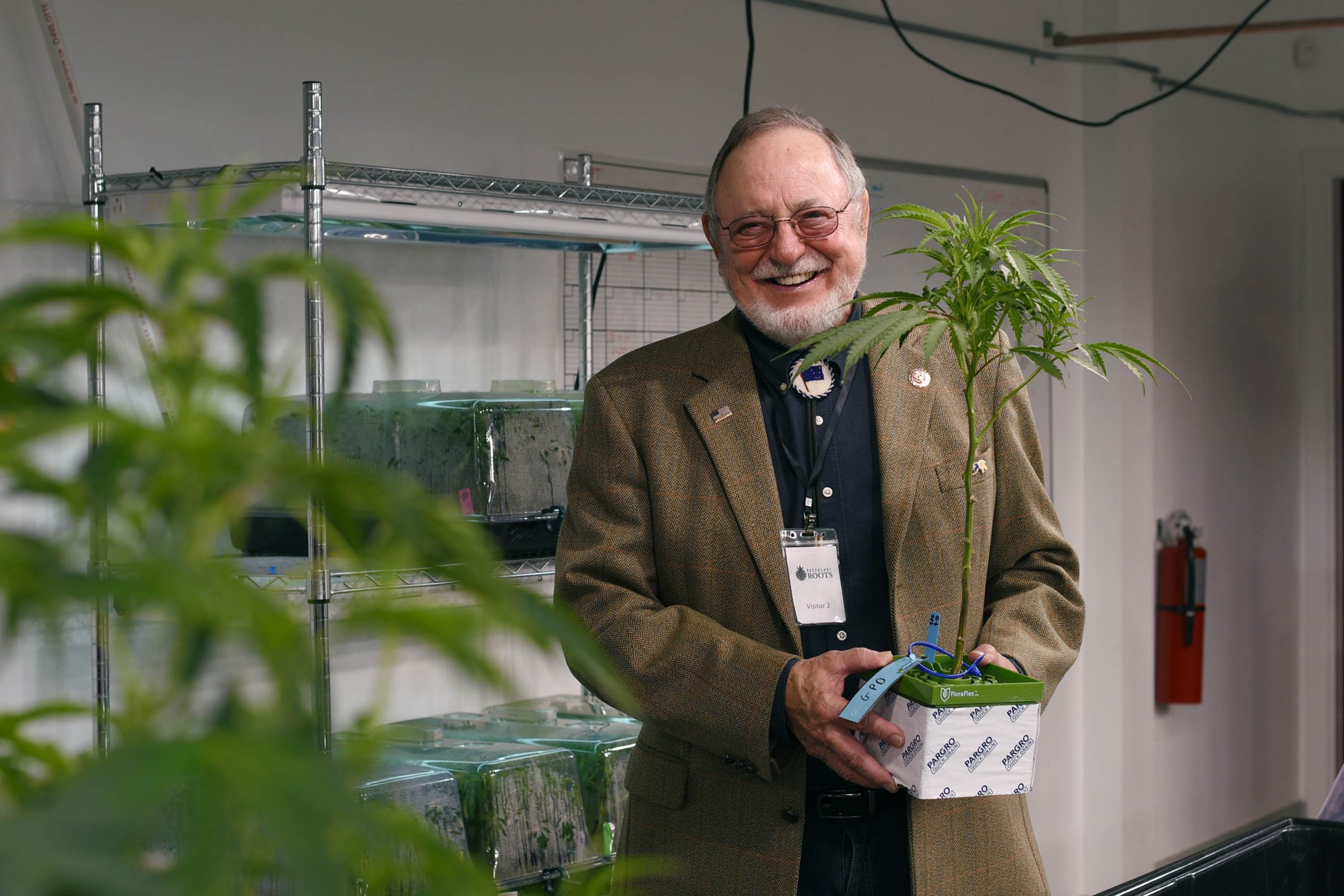
Caucus co-founder Don Young posing with a cannabis plant in 2019

Current members:

- Dina Titus (D‑NV)
- Ilhan Omar (D‑MN)
- David Joyce (R‑OH)
- Brian Mast (R‑FL)

Past members:

- Jared Polis (D‑CO) – elected Colorado governor in 2018
- Dana Rohrabacher (R‑CA) – defeated during 2018 election
- Don Young (R‑AK) – died in office, March 2022
- Earl Blumenauer (D‑OR) - retired in 2024
- Barbara Lee (D‑CA) - did not seek re-election in 2024
