= New York Cannabis Law =

Law legalizing recreational cannabis in US state

Marihuana Regulation and Taxation Act

New York State Legislature
- Long title: An act in relation to constituting chapter 7-A of the consolidated laws, in relation to the creation of a new office of cannabis management, as an independent entity within the division of alcoholic beverage control, providing for the licensure of persons authorized to cultivate, process, distribute and sell cannabis and the use of cannabis by persons aged twenty-one or older; to amend the public health law, in relation to the description of cannabis; to amend the penal law, in relation to the growing and use of cannabis by persons twenty-one years of age or older; to amend the tax law, in relation to providing for the levying of taxes on cannabis; to amend the criminal procedure law, the civil practice law and rules, the general business law, the state finance law, the executive law, the penal law, the alcoholic beverage control law, the general obligations law, the social services law, the labor law, the family court act, and the vehicle and traffic law, in relation to making conforming changes; to amend the public health law, in relation to the definition of smoking; to amend the state finance law, in relation to establishing the New York state cannabis revenue fund, the New York state drug treatment and public education fund and the New York state community grants reinvestment fund; to amend chapter 90 of the laws of 2014 amending the public health law, the tax law, the state finance law, the general business law, the penal law and the criminal procedure law relating to medical use of marihuana, in relation to the effectiveness thereof; to amend chapter 174 of the laws of 1968 constituting the urban development corporation act, in relation to loans to social and economic equity applicants, providing increased drug recognition awareness and Advanced Roadside Impaired Driver Enforcement training, directing a study designed to evaluate methodologies and technologies for the detection of cannabis-impaired driving, providing for the transfer of employees and functions from the department of health to the office of cannabis management; to repeal certain provisions of the public health law relating to growing of cannabis and medical use of marihuana; to repeal article 221 of the penal law relating to offenses involving marihuana; to repeal paragraph (f) of subdivision 2 of section 850 of the general business law relating to drug related paraphernalia; and to repeal certain provisions of the penal law relating to making conforming changes
- Citation: Chapter 92 of the Laws of 2021
- Territorial extent: New York
- Enacted by: New York State Legislature
- Enacted: March 31, 2021

Legislative history
- Bill citation: S854-A of 2021-2022
- Introduced by: Senator Liz Krueger and Assemblyperson Crystal Peoples-Stokes
- Introduced: January 2021
- Status: In force

The Cannabis Law legalizes recreational cannabis in New York. It is chapter 7-A of the Consolidated Laws of New York, and was originally enacted by the Marihuana Regulation and Taxation Act on March 31, 2021.

== History ==
A version of the bill was introduced by state senator Liz Krueger in December, 2013. In January, 2018, the New York State Assembly Standing Committees on Codes, Health, and Alcohol and Drug Abuse opened public hearings on a reintroduced bill. Testimony at the hearings came from those who thought the law would endorse a gateway drug, and those who thought it would decrease opioid abuse. The bill "stalled" in April, without sufficient Senate support, and was not included in the acts for the annual state budget. A new bill (A1617/S1527) was introduced in mid May. The May 31 passage of the Illinois Cannabis Regulation and Tax Act, the first legalization and regulatory system entirely enacted by a state legislature, was said by a cannabis industry executive to have the potential to "pave the way" for legislation in Northeast states like New York and New Jersey. The bill did not receive a vote by the end of the session in June, 2019. Attempts to pursue legalization during the 2020 session were derailed by the COVID-19 pandemic.

It was reintroduced in January 2021 as A1248/S854 by Senator Krueger and Assemblywoman Crystal D. Peoples-Stokes. A competitive proposal, the New York Cannabis Regulation and Taxation Act was proposed by the state governor on January 19, 2021 as part of the state budget. On March 24–25, 2021, The New York Times and The Wall Street Journal reported that an agreement had been reached between the legislature and the governor to adopt the bill and remove the similar measure from the governor's budget proposal. On March 28, the Associated Press said the bill would become law in days. The bill cleared the Senate finance and rules committees on March 30, and placed on the floor calendar. It was passed by the Senate 40–23 and by the Assembly 94–56 the same day. It became law upon the signature of Governor Andrew Cuomo on March 31.

== Provisions, revenue and administration ==
The law includes several provisions regulating the possession and sale of recreational marijuana. Adults aged 21 or older are allowed to possess up to 3 ounces of cannabis flower on their person or up to 24 grams of concentrated cannabis. The law also allows public consumption of marijuana where tobacco smoking is allowed, a first in the United States.

Home cultivation of marijuana is permitted, but remains illegal until 18 months after the first sale of recreational marijuana at a state-licensed dispensary, which would be no sooner than April 1, 2022. The law also expands the state's existing medical marijuana program, allowing doctors greater discretion to prescribe cannabis to patients without needing to cite a specific state-defined qualifying condition.

Tax revenue under the act for the City of New York was estimated by the state comptroller in 2017 to be at least $400 million annually. The state legal market was reported in 2018 by The New York Times to be worth $1.7 billion annually.

The act creates the Office of Cannabis Management charged with all regulation related to cannabis, to include hemp.

Amendments made in April–May 2019 included provisions for expungement of some past cannabis-related convictions. 300,000 convictions could be eligible.

== Support and opposition ==
Support from the bill in 2019 came from civil rights groups, citing racial inequities stemming from the War on Drugs. The New York Farm Bureau supported the bill. The district attorneys of Albany County and New York County (Manhattan), David Soares and Cyrus Vance Jr., published an op-ed in the New York Daily News supporting the bill, citing its correction of racial injustice and the freeing up of finite law enforcement resources for other matters. Vance had already ended prosecuting most marijuana offenses in New York City as of August, 2018.

Opposition in 2019 came from the out-of-state organization Smart Approaches to Marijuana who spent $10,000 on billboards criticizing legislators who promoted the bill. Long Island legislators not favoring the bill said that law enforcement had expressed "concerns" about cannabis and impaired driving, and legalization was opposed by New York State Association of PBAs (police unions) and the New York State Association of Chiefs of Police. New York State PTA opposed the bill.

== See also ==
- Cannabis in New York
- List of 2019 United States cannabis reform proposals
- List of 2021 United States cannabis reform proposals
- La Guardia Committee
