= List of cannabis-related lists =

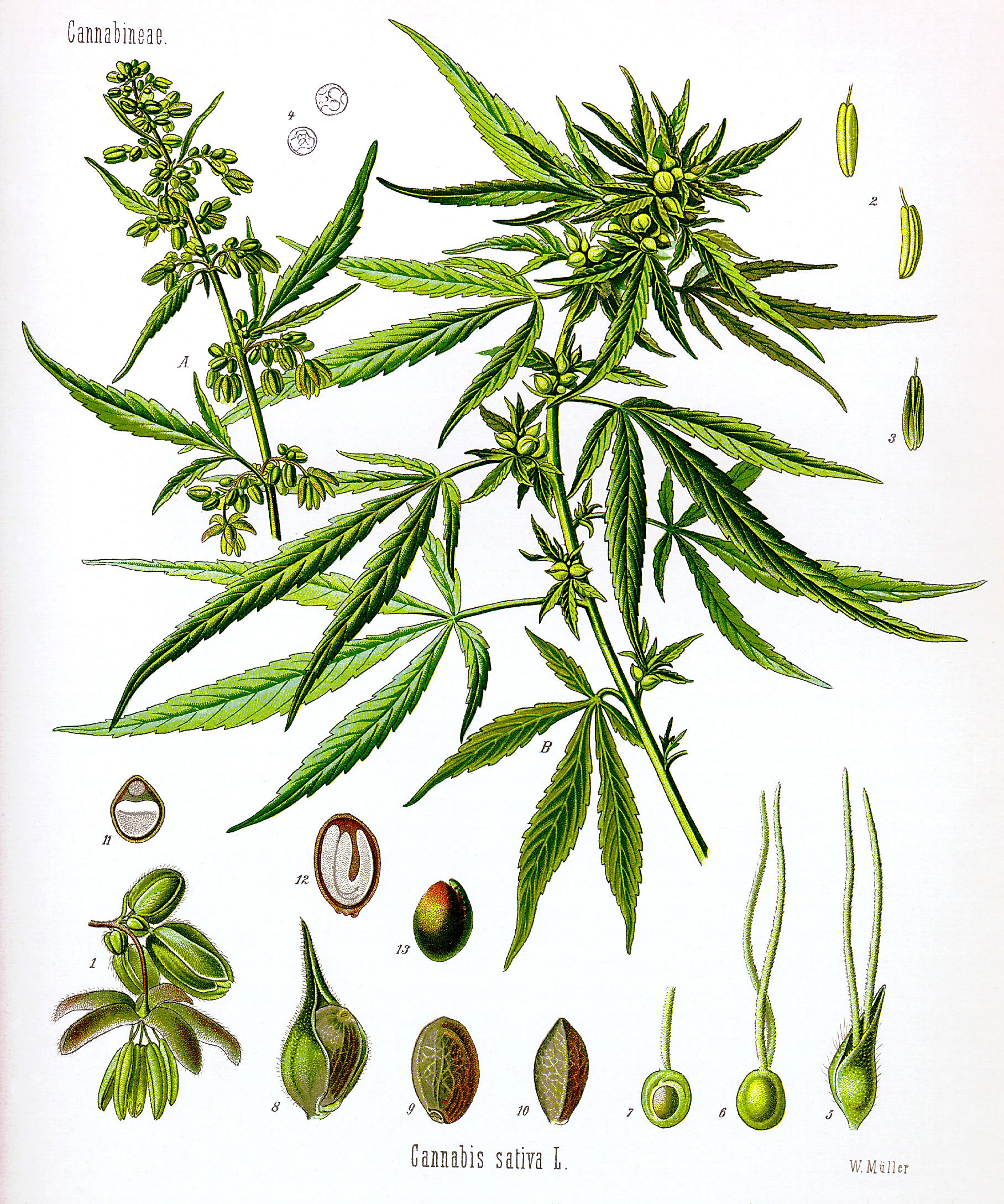
Illustration of Cannabis sativa

This List of cannabis-related lists gives an index to different lists of articles related to cannabis. The lists are organized by legal topics, organizations, the hemp plant, popular culture and country. See Category:Cannabis for a complete set of articles related to cannabis.

== Chemistry ==
- Comparison of phytocannabinoids
- List of AM cannabinoids
- List of CP cannabinoids
- List of HU cannabinoids
- List of JWH cannabinoids
- List of miscellaneous designer cannabinoids

== Legal ==
- Arguments for and against drug prohibition
- List of cannabis seizures
- Minors and the legality of cannabis
- Timeline of cannabis law

== Organizations ==
- Cannabis political parties
- List of addiction and substance abuse organizations
- List of anti-cannabis organizations
- List of cannabis companies
- List of cannabis rights leaders
- List of cannabis rights organizations

== Hemp ==
- List of cannabis seed companies
- List of hemp diseases
- List of hemp products
- List of hemp varieties

== Popular culture ==
- Counterculture Hall of Fame
- Glossary of cannabis terms
- List of books about cannabis
- List of cannabis columns
- List of cannabis competitions
- List of cannabis hoaxes
- List of celebrities who own cannabis businesses
- List of drug films
- List of films containing frequent marijuana use
- List of names for cannabis
- List of names for cannabis strains
- List of psychedelic drugs
- List of rolling papers
- List of slang names for cannabis

== By country ==
- Adult lifetime cannabis use by country
- Legality of cannabis
- List of countries by annual cannabis use

=== Canada ===
- List of Canadian cannabis regulatory agencies
- List of licensed producers of medical marijuana in Canada

=== United Kingdom ===
- Drugs controlled by the UK Misuse of Drugs Act
- List of British politicians who have acknowledged cannabis use

=== United States ===
- Cannabis dispensaries in the United States
- Legality of cannabis by U.S. jurisdiction
- List of 2016 United States cannabis reform proposals
- List of 2017 United States cannabis reform proposals
- List of 2018 United States cannabis reform proposals
- List of 2019 United States cannabis reform proposals
- List of 2020 United States cannabis reform proposals
- List of 2021 United States cannabis reform proposals
- List of 2022 United States cannabis reform proposals
- List of 2023 United States cannabis reform proposals
- List of 2024 United States cannabis reform proposals
- List of Schedule I controlled substances (U.S.)
- List of United States cannabis regulatory agencies
- List of United States politicians who have acknowledged cannabis use
