= Cannabis policy of the Biden administration =

U.S. President Joe Biden stated in February 2021 that his administration would pursue cannabis decriminalization as well as seek expungements for people with prior cannabis convictions. As of October 2022, Biden pardoned thousands of people convicted of marijuana possession under federal law. However, according to the Marshall Project, nobody was released from prison as a result of the October 2022 pardons, as no federal inmates were incarcerated for simple marijuana use at the time.

== Background ==
The use, sale, and possession of cannabis over 0.3% delta-9-THC in the United States, despite state laws, is illegal under federal law. As a Schedule I drug under the federal Controlled Substances Act of 1970, cannabis over 0.3% delta-9-THC (legal term marijuana) is considered to have "no accepted medical use" and have a high potential for abuse and physical or psychological dependence. Cannabis use is illegal for any reason, with the exception of FDA-approved research programs; however, individual states have enacted legislation permitting exemptions for various uses, mainly for medical and industrial use but often also recreational use.

=== Cannabis policy of Donald Trump ===
Trump indicated during his 2016 presidential campaign that he favored leaving the issue of legalization of marijuana to the states, but his administration never acted on the federal prohibition of cannabis, and Trump's 2021 fiscal budget proposal included less protections for state medical marijuana laws. In 2018, Trump's administration also rescinded the 2013 Cole Memorandum, an Obama-era Justice Department policy that generally directed federal prosecutors not to pursue cannabis prosecutions in states where the drug is legal as a matter of state law.

=== State legalizations ===
==== 2020 elections ====
Cannabis legalization was approved via November 2020 ballot measures in the three states of Arizona, Montana, and New Jersey. Additionally, medical cannabis was legalized via ballot measures during the same election in Mississippi and South Dakota; South Dakota became the first state to legalize medical and recreational cannabis simultaneously, though its referendum for recreational cannabis was nullified by a court. Observers noted that cannabis legalization was approved in states with both conservative and liberal electorates, making it one of the few issues to gain broad bipartisan support in an otherwise highly divisive election.

==== 2021 ====
The trend continued in 2021, as legalization was approved at the state level in Biden-carried states of New Mexico, New York, Virginia, New Jersey, and Connecticut. During his 2020 presidential campaign, Biden said "individual states should decide whether to legalize it for recreational use."

==== 2022–23 elections ====
Statewide ballot measures on cannabis legalization were held during the 2022 and 2023 elections. The states of Maryland, Missouri, and Ohio voted to legalize recreational cannabis, while the states of Arkansas, North Dakota, South Dakota, and Oklahoma voted against measures that would do the same.

== Cannabis policy ==
As of March 2023, although Biden had stood for decriminalization and descheduling during his campaign, the administration had not formulated an explicit policy on cannabis. Some political and cannabis industry observers like the editor of Leafly thought the administration would be likely to assist in carrying out his campaign promises on cannabis through the MORE Act, sponsored by then-Senator Kamala Harris, or through executive order. Failing full legalization, he could improve banking access by supporting the SAFE Act.

In March, 2021, the Daily Beast reported that "dozens" of White House staffers had been "suspended, asked to resign or placed in a remote work program" because they had admitted to prior cannabis use. This action affected even those whose use had occurred in legal states. When asked for comment, White House Press Secretary Jen Psaki acknowledged that five staffers had been fired over the issue. In addition, Biden himself, when asked to comment on US track and field athlete Sha'carri Richardson's 30-day suspension from the 2020 Tokyo Olympics due to a failed drug test, initially offered, "the rules are the rules." After it was announced that Richardson would be denied the chance to compete after the 30-day suspension was lifted, Psaki later suggested that the rules surrounding Richardson's suspension be re-examined.

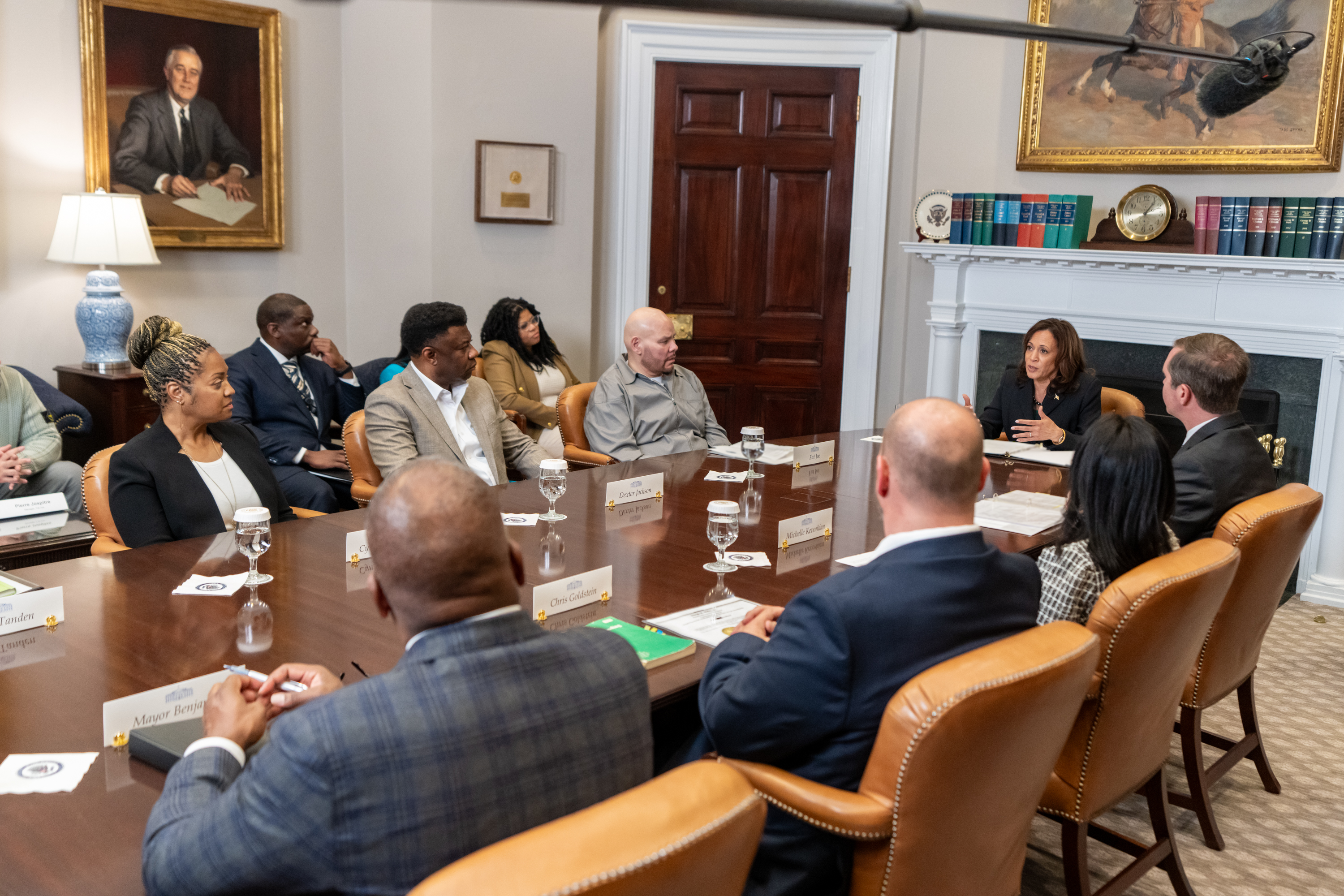
Vice President Kamala Harris leads a roundtable discussion on cannabis reform at the White House on March 15, 2024

In May 2021, the Drug Enforcement Administration approved licensed facilities to grow cannabis for the purpose of medical research for the first time since 1968. Prior to this, the University of Mississippi was the only institution in the United States legally permitted to grow the plant for that use. Previously, in 2016, an application process was put in place for research growers, but no applications were later approved under the Trump administration.

In October 2022, President Biden announced a mass pardon for past federal cannabis possession convictions, encouraged governors to do the same for state cannabis possession convictions, and instructed Attorney General Merrick Garland and Secretary of Health and Human Services Xavier Becerra to review the classification schedule of marijuana, which could result in removal of cannabis from Schedule I of the Controlled Substances Act.

On December 2, 2022, Biden signed the Medical Marijuana and Cannabidiol Research Expansion Act.

The Viktor Bout–Brittney Griner prisoner exchange occurred on December 8, 2022, which involved an American WNBA athlete being convicted of cannabis possession on Russian soil.

In May 2024, Kevin Sabet of Smart Approaches to Marijuana stated that Joe Biden made a promise on the campaign trail to reclassify marijuana, with the word "reclassify" being used to reflect an opposition by Biden to federal legalization. This was right after the May 21, 2024 announcement in the federal register of FDA’s intention to reschedule cannabis from schedule I to schedule III and acknowledgement that marijuana had currently accepted medical uses. (That is, while THC and CBD are FDA-approved, the FDA has not approved the plant itself and there are no applications in front of the FDA seeking its approval.) The FDA has yet to finalize the rescheduling and the process is mired by legal battles among various stakeholders and even between government agencies.
