= List of United States cannabis regulatory agencies =

Legality of medical and non-medical cannabis in the United States. Areas under tribal sovereignty not shown.

Cannabis regulatory agencies exist in several of the U.S. states and territories, the one federal district, and several areas under tribal sovereignty in the United States which have legalized cannabis. In November 2020, 19 state agencies formed the Cannabis Regulators Association.

The agencies include:

== Federal ==
- Drug Enforcement Administration
- Food and Drug Administration
- United States Department of Agriculture (hemp)
- Cannabis Justice Office (grantmaking office, proposed under Marijuana Opportunity Reinvestment and Expungement Act of 2019)

=== Territorial or Federal district ===
- Commonwealth of Northern Mariana Islands Cannabis Commission, in formation as of October 2018 pursuant to CNMI Cannabis Act of 2018.
- District of Columbia Alcoholic Beverage and Cannabis Administration (ABCA), formerly the Alcoholic Beverage Regulation Administration (ABRA). Was the Department of Health Division of Medical Marijuana and Integrative Therapy until October 1, 2020; medical cannabis only – there is no regulatory agency for other use. (Note: Regulatory agency not authorized by U.S. Congress; see Cannabis in Washington, D.C.)
- Puerto Rico Medical Cannabis Regulatory Board (a division of the Puerto Rico Department of Health). The Board was created in 2017 under the MEDICINAL Act of 2017.

== State ==
- Alabama Medical Cannabis Commission (as of 13 September 2021, since 8/3/2021, agency has met 3x regular, 2x special/called, but does not yet have a website)
- Alaska Marijuana Control Board (MCB)
- Arizona Department of Health Services (under 2020 Arizona Proposition 207)
- California Bureau of Cannabis Control
  - San Francisco Office of Cannabis
- Colorado Department of Revenue Enforcement Division Marijuana Enforcement (MED)
- Connecticut Department of Consumer Protection
- Georgia Access to Medical Cannabis Commission
- Illinois Department of Financial and Professional Regulation, Cannabis Regulation Oversight Officer
- Iowa Medical Cannabidiol Board
- Maine Office of Cannabis Policy
- Maryland Medical Cannabis Commission
- Massachusetts Cannabis Control Commission
- Michigan Cannabis Regulatory Agency
- Minnesota Office of Cannabis Management
- Montana Department of Revenue
- Nebraska Medical Cannabis Commission
- Nevada Department of Taxation
- New Jersey Cannabis Regulatory Commission
- New Mexico Cannabis Control Division
- New York Office of Cannabis Management
- Ohio Department of Commerce
  - Ohio Medical Marijuana Control Program
  - Division of Cannabis Control
- Oklahoma Medical Marijuana Authority
- Oregon Liquor Control Commission
- Rhode Island Office of Cannabis Regulation
- Virginia Cannabis Control Authority
- Washington State Liquor and Cannabis Board
- West Virginia Department of Health and Human Resources
  - Bureau for Public Health
    - Office of Medical Cannabis

=== Proposed ===
- Alabama Medical Cannabis Commission
- Arkansas Bureau of Cannabis Control
- Delaware Office of Marijuana Control Commissioner
- Hawaii Department of Taxation
- Indiana Cannabis Compliance Commission
- Kentucky Department of Alcoholic Beverage and Cannabis Control
- Louisiana Office of Alcohol and Tobacco Control
  - Cannabis Management Office
- Ohio Department of Commerce
  - Division of Cannabis Control (Regulate Cannabis Like Alcohol initiative)
- Pennsylvania Cannabis Regulatory Control Board (2021); Pennsylvania Cannabis Control Board (2026)
- Vermont Cannabis Control Board (Note: Cannabis is legal in Vermont, but there is no regulatory agency. See Cannabis in Vermont § Action towards a regulatory system)

== Tribal ==
- Eastern Band of Cherokee Indians Cannabis Commission
- Puyallup Tribal Cannabis Committee, Puyallup Tribe, Washington
- Squaxin Island Tribe, Washington
- Suquamish Tribe has direct tribal council control via Suquamish Evergreen Corporation (Washington)
- Tulalip Tribal Cannabis Agency, Tulalip Tribes of Washington, became the first tribal regulatory agency in mid-2018
- Cannabis Compliance Office reporting to the Saint Regis Mohawk Tribe Cannabis Control Board
- Swinomish Tribe Swinomish Development Authority (Washington)

== See also ==
- Legality of cannabis by U.S. jurisdiction
- List of Canadian cannabis regulatory agencies
- Mexican Cannabis Institute
