= Cannabis in Washington =

Cannabis in Washington may refer to:

- Cannabis in Washington (state)
- Cannabis in Washington, D.C.
