= List of 2024 United States cannabis reform proposals =

- 2023 ← → 2025
- Legality of cannabis in the United States (2023)
- Status: Legal for recreational use Legal for medical use Illegal

== Federal ==
=== Executive action ===
The Federal administrative process that began with President Biden's directive in 2022, and in 2023 with a recommendation by the Department of Health and Human Services to reschedule cannabis to Schedule III of the Controlled Substances Act was incomplete at the beginning of 2024. The President made descheduling and other cannabis reforms a topic of the 2024 State of the Union Address; it was the first time the word "marijuana" had been used in a State of the Union Address since Ronald Reagan called it a target of the war on drugs alongside cocaine in 1988. The Drug Enforcement Administration initiated a 2024 policy review to potentially reschedule marijuana as a Schedule III drug, amounting to "the agency's biggest policy change in more than 50 years".

Some hiring and retention policies in federal employment and the armed forces evolved during 2024. The policy for US Navy recruits was adjusted to allow positive urinalysis tests for cannabis during boot camp to be non-disqualifying. U.S. Customs and Border Protection adjusted its scope of cannabis use to consider only the prior 90 days' admitted use when hiring, instead of the prior standard of several years. The Drug Enforcement Agency itself settled a wrongful termination lawsuit brought by an agent who had a positive urinalysis test for THC metabolites, when he had been taking legal cannabidiol (CBD), and reinstated the agent with back pay and paid his legal fees.

During the 2024 United States presidential campaign, both major party U.S. presidential candidates promised to support either rescheduling or legalization.

=== Bills ===
Since 2011, HUD has prohibited use and growing in any low income housing. On January 25, Senator Cory Booker introduced S.3671, that would end restrictions on cannabis users in federally funded housing, provided the use is in compliance with state law. The same day, a matching House bill H.R. 7094 was introduced by Rep. Eleanor Holmes Norton.

The Consolidated Appropriations Act, 2024 passed by the House on March 6 contained language directing the Department of Justice to study state legalization and regulation, a provision of the failed 2023 PREPARE Act that Rep. Dave Joyce had called preparation for "the inevitable end to federal cannabis prohibition".

In a Dear Colleague letter, Senate Majority Leader Chuck Schumer and others announced plans to reintroduce the Cannabis Administration and Opportunity Act before April 20.

The 2024 National Defense Authorization Act passed by the House of Representatives on June 14, 2024 contains reform language related to cannabis drug testing of military recruits. The military still retains a Zero tolerance policy for those who use any form of THC on active duty.

S.4711, whose official title was "A bill to limit the consideration of marijuana use when making an employment suitability or security clearance determination, and for other purposes", was introduced on July 11 by Senator Gary Peters. It "would prohibit federal agencies from using past marijuana use as the sole factor in determining employment suitability, qualification standards, or eligibility for security clearances and federal credentials" and "exempt marijuana from a blanket denial in security clearance statutes". The bill cleared the Senate Homeland Security and Governmental Affairs Committee, of which Peters was chairperson, on September 18.

== State and tribal ==
=== State legislation and initiatives ===
In Anchorage, Alaska the Assembly tried to pass a local ordinance to allow additional methods for dispensaries to sell cannabis. These methods include; sales by drive-thru, Internet and by phone. Police Chief Michael Kerle opposed these measures which were eventually voted down.

In Connecticut, William Tong, Connecticut Attorney General, filed civil court actions against 7 dispensaries citing packaging and dosage complications.

Kentucky HB 72 was introduced in early January by Nima Kulkarni to legalize possession but not sales of cannabis.

The governor of Wisconsin, Tony Evers (D), said in early January that he would sign a medical cannabis bill if it was passed by the legislature. The bill, which includes state-run dispensaries, was introduced on January 8 by lawmakers in the majority-Republican state assembly.

On January 3, Erica Layon (R) introduced New Hampshire HB 1633, adult-use legalization. The bill passed by 239-136 house vote on April 11, 2024. It was passed by the Senate Judiciary Committee on May 8, with 36 pages of amendments, then passed by the senate on May 16. An amended bill was returned from bicameral conference committee on June 5. On June 13, the bill passed 14-10 in the New Hampshire Senate, then was tabled (killed) in the House.

Around January 7, the Hawaii Attorney General released an over 300-page draft legalization bill to be considered by the state legislature. A state senate legalization bill, SB3335, was introduced on January 24. Hawaii SB 2487 was introduced around January 26. On February 13, SB3335 was passed by both the Human Services Committee and the Judiciary Committee, and was on its way for a second reading in the state senate. By the end of February, Ways and Means had passed the bill and it was cleared for a third reading. The state senate passed the bill on March 5. By March 19, the senate bill had cleared all house committees it was assigned to but one, the house finance committee, prior to a house floor vote.

In January, Washington state legislator Shelley Kloba introduced HB 2194, a bill that would allow home grow. The bill was killed in the House Appropriations Committee.

Virginia SB 448, allowing regulated sales in the state where possession was legalized in 2021, was introduced by state senator Aaron Rouse in 2023 and was advanced by committee in January 2024. It was approved by a second committee on January 31, before the final Finance and Appropriations Committee hearing that precedes a possible floor vote.

Also in Virginia, SB 696, is aimed at individuals charged with felonies associated with marijuana prior to July 1, 2021 be released.

South Carolina Senate Bill 0423, the South Carolina Compassionate Care Act legalizing medical cannabis, was reintroduced on January 19 by Tom Davis (R). A special order on the bill received two thirds majority vote of the state senate on February 7, bypassing further committees and debate before a full floor vote. The bill was passed by the senate on February 14.

Kentucky HB 420 to legalize and regulate cannabis for adult use was introduced by Keturah Herron on January 31.

West Virginia House Bill 4873 to legalize and regulate cannabis for adult use was introduced by Joey Garcia and six other house delegates.

In the annual budget address, the Governor of Pennsylvania, Josh Shapiro, requested the legislature to legalize cannabis to bring in $250 million annual revenue and eliminate diversion of law enforcement resources from higher priorities. Pennsylvania HB 2210, legalization was introduced by sponsor Amen Brown and referred to Health Committee 2024-04-09; the matching senate bill SB 846 dates from 2023.

The Florida Supreme Court issued a ruling on April 1 that the Florida marijuana legalization initiative, 2024 Florida Amendment 3, would appear on the November ballot.

On April 25, the North Dakota Secretary of State approved an adult-use legalization initiative, supported by New Economic Frontier, for signature collection. It could appear on the 2024 or 2025 ballot.

On May 7, South Dakotans for Better Marijuana Laws delivered 29,000 voter signatures to the South Dakota Secretary of State, enough to get the initiative on the ballot if at least 60% are validated. It was certified for the 2024 ballot on June 3.

On a 49-4 vote, the California Assembly passed a bill, AB 1775, allowing cannabis lounges on May 20. The bill was passed with amendments by the state senate on August 27, then re-approved by the assembly on August 28. Another bill, AB 1111, was approved by both chambers, and would allow sales by farmers at temporary events such as the California State Fair. Governor Newsom signed the lounge bill into law on September 30, and vetoed AB 1111.

Nebraska initiative measures 437 and 438 were approved by voters on November 5, legalizing medical cannabis and establishing Nebraska Medical Cannabis Commission as the state regulatory agency.

=== Tribal actions ===
Under the legalization referendum approved by tribal members in 2023, the Eastern Band of Cherokee Indians began recreational cannabis sales on tribal land in North Carolina on September 7.
