= List of Canadian cannabis regulatory agencies =

Several provincial agencies and crown corporations regulate sales of Cannabis in Canada, following national legalization in 2018 under the Cannabis Act.

- Alberta Gaming, Liquor and Cannabis Commission
- British Columbia Liquor and Cannabis Regulation Branch
- New Brunswick Liquor Corporation
- Newfoundland and Labrador Liquor Corporation
- Northwest Territories Liquor Commission
- Nova Scotia Liquor Corporation
- Nunavut Liquor and Cannabis Commission
- Alcohol and Gaming Commission of Ontario
- Saskatchewan Liquor and Gaming Authority

== See also ==
- List of United States cannabis regulatory agencies
- Mexican Cannabis Institute
