= List of 2026 United States cannabis reform proposals =

- 2025 ← → 2027
- Legality of cannabis in the United States (2023)
- Status: Legal for recreational use Legal for medical use Illegal

== Federal ==
=== Executive action ===
On December 18, 2025, President Trump signed Executive Order 14370 to expedite rescheduling cannabis from Schedule I to Schedule III, requiring the U.S. Attorney General to do so. As of April 2026, the rescheduling still had not occurred and pointed inquiry as to the inaction was initiated by U.S. Representative Steve Cohen of Tennessee. According to a Salon commenter, the rescheduling order "has enemies like Attorney General Pam Bondi" within the administration itself.

==== Other executive department reform ====
Centers for Medicare & Medicaid Services introduced Substance Access Beneficiary Engagement Incentive allowing dispensing of government-funded CBD and THC products to some people with qualifying medical conditions, and United States Food and Drug Administration (FDA) made matching exemptions to avoid interference with the program.

== State and tribal ==
=== State legislation and initiatives ===
On March 20, 2026, sponsors of the 2026 Idaho medical cannabis initiative announced that they had gathered enough signatures for it to appear on the 2026 ballot.
