= National Cannabis Festival =

Annual festival in Washington, D.C.

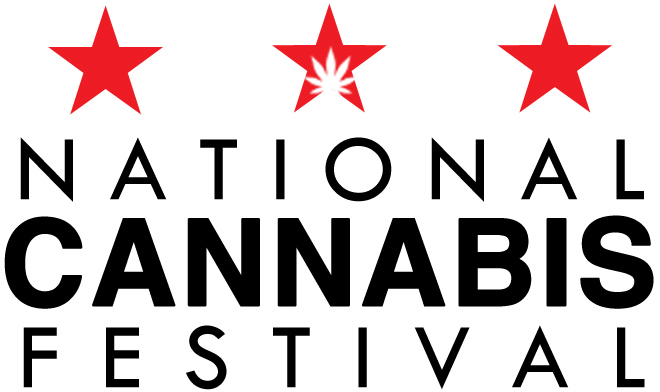
- Genre: hip hop, funk, reggae, electronic dance music, world music
- Locations: Washington, D.C., U.S.
- Years active: 2016-present
- Founders: Caroline Phillips
- Most recent: August 28, 2021
- Next event: April 23, 2022
- Website: nationalcannabisfestival.com

The National Cannabis Festival is a yearly, one-day event held at the Robert F. Kennedy Memorial Stadium festival grounds with a focus on the music, advocacy, education, and activism related to cannabis in Washington, D.C. The festival debuted in 2016 following the passing of Initiative 71, a voter-approved ballot initiative that legalized recreational use of marijuana in the District of Columbia. It was founded by Caroline Phillips, who announced the inaugural event with an Indiegogo campaign, raising an initial $21,000 to help cover costs through crowd-sourced fundraising efforts. The festival includes music concerts, an education pavilion, and vendor fair.

== 2016 ==
National Cannabis Festival's inaugural event occurred on August 23, 2016, and was headlined by De La Soul, Jesse Royal, and BackYard Band. Despite legalization, DC's law stipulates cannabis can't be used in a public space. As result, the 2016 festival was a weed-free event.

=== Music line-up ===
- De La Soul
- Jesse Royal
- BackYard Band
- Congo Sanchez
- Nappy Riddem
- Awthentik
- Alison Carney
- DJ Ayes Cold
- Ethan Spalding

=== Education pavilion ===
The education pavilion featured talks and demonstrations about cannabis growing, consumption, and social issues. The most well-attended panel was the CannaTank competition, a contest for cannabis entrepreneurs to pitch their inventions to a panel of judges to win $1,000 toward their company. The 2016 judges panel included David Grosso, an at-large member of the Council of the District of Columbia. The winner was the Ardent NOVO decarboxylator, a device designed to optimize the cannabis flower's THC yield through process of decarboxylation.

== 2017 ==
On November 17, 2016, organizers announced the 2017 event would occur on April 22, 2017, and would feature performances by Talib Kweli, The Pharcyde, BackYard Band, Kanyatta Hill of Culture, Empresarios, Pinky Killacorn & Visto, Reesa Renee, and DJ Ayes Cold. The Festival's second event occurred on April 22, 2017, and once again it was a weed-free event.
