= South Carolina Compassionate Care Act =

The South Carolina Compassionate Care Act (S.150 / H.3361) is a 2022 bill in the South Carolina legislature to allow medical cannabis.

== History ==
The bill was prefiled December 9, 2020. Primary sponsors were Rep. Bill Herbkersman and Sen. Tom Davis, both Republicans. It was advanced by the Senate Medical Affairs Committee in March 2021, but failed to receive a vote in that year's session, and was scheduled by the Senate majority leader to be the first item debated in 2022. Senate floor debate began on January 26, 2022 – the first time cannabis legalization of any kind had been debated in South Carolina. As of February 9, 2022, the bill had survived seven days of debate and a vote to gut the bill. It received a 28–15 vote for a second reading in the senate on February 9, and final passage by the senate on February 10.

It was reintroduced as Senate Bill 0423 in January, 2024.

== See also ==
- List of 2022 United States cannabis reform proposals
- List of 2024 United States cannabis reform proposals
