= 2022 Maryland Question 4 =

Referendum question in Maryland

Referendum Question 4
- November 8, 2022
- Cannabis - Legalization of Adult Use and Possession

Results
| Choice | Votes | % |
|---|---|---|
| Yes | 1,302,180 | 67.20% |
| No | 635,580 | 32.80% |
| Valid votes | 1,937,760 | 100.00% |
| Invalid or blank votes | 0 | 0.00% |
| Total votes | 1,937,760 | 100.00% |

Yes
90–100%
80–90%
70–80%
60–70%
50–60%
No
90–100%
80–90%
70–80%
60–70%
50–60%
Other
Tie
No votes

Question 4 was a voter referendum to amend the Constitution of Maryland in order to legalize cannabis for adult use in Maryland. The referendum was approved overwhelmingly, with more than twice as many voters voting in favor of it than against it and winning in all but one county, on November 8, 2022. It went into effect on July 1, 2023.

== Ballot measure ==
The ballot measure read as follows:

Question 1
Constitutional Amendment

Do you favor the legalization of the use of cannabis by an individual who is at least 21 years of age on or after July 1, 2023, in the State of Maryland?

The choices read as follows:

For the Constitutional Amendment
Against the Constitutional Amendment

== History ==
On July 16, 2021, State House Speaker Adrienne A. Jones created a committee to draft a referendum on legalization to place on the ballot in 2022. Around December 25, the chairman of the state House Cannabis Referendum and Legalization Workgroup, Luke Clippinger, pre-filed House Bill 1 for the 2022 session, to initiate the citizen referendum in 2022 that would create a constitutional amendment to legalize cannabis. The referendum bill and accompanying bill implementing legalization, House Bill 837 received public testimony and were discussed by the House Judiciary Committee on February 14, 2022. House Bill 1 was passed 96–34 by the House of Delegates on February 25. This bill was contingent on passage of the ballot referendum in the November 2022 election, whereby it would legalize recreational use of cannabis possession and use on or after July 1, 2023. The constitutional referendum and the legalization bill were both passed by the Maryland Senate on April 1. Senate Finance Committee hearings on the bills began on March 23.

Voters approved the referendum on November 8, 2022, with 67.2% of voters and 23 of 24 counties and county-equivalents (all but Garrett County) in favor. It fully took effect on July 1, 2023.

== Provisions ==
The bill provides for adults 21 and older to purchase and possess up to 1 1/2 ounces (43 g) of marijuana and decriminalize possession of amounts greater than that up to 2 1/2 ounces (71 g). This bill would also establish a Cannabis Business Assistance Fund to support equity initiatives for minority- and women-owned businesses. That fund would go toward incubator and educational programs to promote participation in the industry by people most impacted by criminalization. The bill would also automatically expunge prior criminal convictions for conduct made legal under the proposed law.

Between January 1 and July 1, 2023, possession of up to 1.5 ounces was to be a civil infraction subject to a $100 fine, as provided by House Bill 837.

== Opinion polls ==
On Question 4

| Poll source | Date(s) administered | Sample size (Note: Key: A – all adults RV – registered voters LV – likely voters V – unclear) | Margin of error | Yes | No | Other | Undecided |
|---|---|---|---|---|---|---|---|
| OpinionWorks | October 20–23, 2022 | 989 (LV) | ± 3.1% | 63% | 25% | – | 12% |
| University of Maryland | September 22–27, 2022 | 810 (RV) | ± 4.0% | 73% | 23% | – | 4% |
| Victoria Research (Note: This poll was sponsored the Yes on 4 Campaign, which supports Question 4) | September 11–19, 2022 | 762 (RV) | ± 3.7% | 69% | 20% | 2% (Note: "Usually skip/Might skip" with 2%) | 8% |
| Goucher College | September 8–12, 2022 | 748 (LV) | ± 3.6% | 59% | 34% | – | 7% |

On whether recreational marijuana should be legal

| Poll source | Date(s) administered | Sample size | Margin of error | Yes | No | Other | Undecided |
|---|---|---|---|---|---|---|---|
| Goucher College | March 1–6, 2022 | 635 (A) | ± 3.9% | 62% | 34% | 1% (Note: "Refused" with 1%) | 3% |
| Goucher College | October 14–20, 2021 | 700 (A) | ± 3.7% | 60% | 33% | 3% (Note: "Refused" with 3%) | 4% |
| Gonzales Research (D) (Note: This poll was sponsored by Douglas J. J. Peters) | May 17–22, 2021 | 301 (LV) (Note: 301 likely Democratic primary voters) | ± 5.8% | 69% | 24% | 7% (Note: "Refused" with 7%) | – |
| Goucher College | February 23–28, 2021 | 725 (A) | ± 3.6% | 67% | 28% | 1% (Note: "Refused" with 1%) | 4% |

== Results ==
2022 Maryland Question 4
| Choice | Votes | % |
|---|---|---|
| For | 1,302,180 | 67.20 |
| Against | 635,580 | 32.80 |
| Total | 1,937,760 | 100.00 |

Source: Maryland State Board of Elections

=== By county ===
By county

Breakdown of voting by county
| County | Yes | | No | | Margin | | Total Votes |
| County | # | % | # | % | # | % | Total Votes |
|---|---|---|---|---|---|---|---|
| Allegany | 11,973 | 58.0% | 8,683 | 42.0% | 3,290 | 15.9% | 20,656 |
| Anne Arundel | 137,461 | 65.4% | 72,579 | 34.6% | 64,882 | 30.9% | 210,040 |
| Baltimore City | 111,227 | 78.9% | 29,718 | 21.1% | 81,509 | 57.8% | 140,945 |
| Baltimore | 176,358 | 66.4% | 89,073 | 33.6% | 87,285 | 32.9% | 265,431 |
| Calvert | 21,640 | 60.2% | 14,301 | 39.8% | 7,339 | 20.4% | 35,941 |
| Caroline | 6,154 | 59.9% | 4,112 | 40.1% | 2,042 | 19.9% | 10,266 |
| Carroll | 41,499 | 59.4% | 28,334 | 40.6% | 13,165 | 18.9% | 69,883 |
| Cecil | 19,435 | 61.1% | 12,349 | 38.9% | 7,086 | 22.3% | 31,784 |
| Charles | 34,198 | 65.3% | 18,204 | 34.7% | 15,994 | 30.5% | 52,402 |
| Dorchester | 6,575 | 60.6% | 4,267 | 39.4% | 2,308 | 21.3% | 10,842 |
| Frederick | 66,991 | 64.9% | 36,210 | 35.1% | 30,781 | 29.8% | 103,201 |
| Garrett | 5,394 | 49.4% | 5,528 | 50.6% | -134 | -1.2% | 10,992 |
| Harford | 61,813 | 61.2% | 39,255 | 38.8% | 22,558 | 22.3% | 101,068 |
| Howard | 84,666 | 66.5 | 42,651 | 33.5% | 42,015 | 33.0% | 127,317 |
| Kent | 5,293 | 65.6% | 2,775 | 34.4% | 2,518 | 31.2% | 8,068 |
| Montgomery | 238,861 | 72.3% | 91,310 | 27.7% | 147,551 | 44.7% | 330,171 |
| Prince George's | 164,177 | 72.1% | 63,686 | 27.9% | 100,491 | 44.1% | 227,863 |
| Queen Anne's | 13,161 | 59.3% | 9,033 | 40.7% | 4,128 | 18.6% | 22,194 |
| St. Mary's | 21,182 | 58.2% | 15,184 | 41.8% | 5,998 | 16.5% | 36,366 |
| Somerset | 3,712 | 58.6% | 2,620 | 41.4% | 1,092 | 17.2% | 6,332 |
| Talbot | 10,459 | 61.3% | 6,598 | 38.7% | 3,861 | 22.6% | 17,057 |
| Washington | 27,501 | 59.0% | 19,134 | 41.0% | 8,367 | 17.9% | 46,635 |
| Wicomico | 18,313 | 62.0% | 11,226 | 38.0% | 7,087 | 24.0% | 29,539 |
| Worcester | 14,118 | 61.8% | 8,742 | 38.2% | 5,376 | 23.5% | 22,860 |
| Total | 1,302,161 | 67.20% | 635,572 | 32.80% | 666,589 | 34.40% | 1,937,733 |

== See also ==
- 2022 Maryland elections
- Cannabis in Maryland
- 2022 Missouri Amendment 3
- List of 2022 United States cannabis reform proposals

== Notes ==
Partisan clients
