= List of 2023 United States cannabis reform proposals =

- 2022 ← → 2024
- Legality of cannabis in the United States (2023)
- Status: Legal for recreational use Legal for medical use Illegal

The year 2023 began with several state efforts to legalize adult-use or medical cannabis, despite an apparently stalled federal effort to do so. A cannabis industry executive predicted that at least two states would enact adult-use reform in 2023, with the most likely states to legalize being Minnesota, Pennsylvania and Ohio. Cannabis eradication for outdoor grows continue in states where the plant is both illegal and legal. Raids in Connecticut, Indiana and Nevada County, California are conducted by helicopter by the state police and National Guard units.

2023 Oklahoma State Question 820 was rejected by over 60% of voters, the largest margin of defeat for a legalization measure since the beginning of the Green rush.

Voters approved 2023 Ohio Issue 2 in November, making Ohio the 24th state to legalize adult use, post-prohibition.

== Federal ==
=== Legislation ===
HR 610, the "Marijuana 1-to-3 Act" to reschedule cannabis to Schedule III of the Controlled Substances Act was introduced by Greg Steube (R) on January 27. It was referred the Committee on Energy and Commerce.

The Industrial Hemp Act was introduced on March 23 by Jon Tester (D) and Mike Braun (R). It would ease hemp regulations for farmers that were created with the 2018 Farm Bill.

Veterans Equal Access Act was introduced by Senators Earl Blumenauer (D) and Brian Mast (R) in March. It would allow Veterans Administration doctors to recommend cannabis to patients in states with medical cannabis programs. (Note: Because of its Schedule I status, cannabis can be recommended but not prescribed in the United States.) Disabled American Veterans, a Veterans Service Organization, released an article in support of cannabis in the July/August 2023 edition.

The PREPARE Act, introduced in 2022, was reintroduced on April 14 by Republican representatives Dave Joyce and Brian Mast, with House Minority Leader Hakeem Jeffries. It would create a federal "Commission on the Federal Regulation of Cannabis" to study regulatory and tax frameworks for legalization, and direct federal departments to do so as well, with a report due in one year.

Gun Rights and Marijuana (GRAM) Act was reintroduced in April by Brian Mast (R).

The Veterans Medical Marijuana Safe Harbor Act, introduced in 2021, was reintroduced on April 19.

The SAFE Banking Act was reintroduced on April 26 in both chambers. Senators Jeff Merkley (D) and Steve Daines (R), and Representatives Dave Joyce (R) and Earl Blumenauer (D) were the lead sponsors.

On April 28, Representative Nancy Mace said she received assurances that the STATES Act would receive a committee vote, in a deal made with the House Speaker concerning a future vote on the U.S. debt ceiling.

On July 26, the House passed by voice vote an amendment to a defense spending bill that would allow Veterans Affairs doctors to recommend cannabis for their U.S. military veteran patients. The provision was incorporated into the Military Construction, Veterans Affairs, and Related Agencies Appropriations Act, 2023, passed by both chambers.

H.R. 5040, the Cannabis Users' Restoration of Eligibility (CURE) Act, which removes cannabis as a consideration for federal employment or security clearance, was introduced in July. The bill was scheduled for markup by the House Committee on Oversight and Accountability on September 20. Senators including Majority Leader Chuck Schumer introduced a new version of the bill called Secure and Fair Enforcement Regulation (SAFER) Banking Act on September 20.

On December 7, Rep. David Royce and four bipartisan cosponsors reintroduced the STATES Act as H.R. 6673.

=== Executive action ===
On February 28, the Office of Personnel Management published a notice in the Federal Register that it was requesting Office of Management and Budget approval to overhaul Federal pre-employment forms to reduce the period of scrutiny regarding cannabis use to the past 90 days, a change already posted as proposed rules in the Federal Register in 2022. The new form is to be called "Personnel Vetting Questionnaire" and will replace several screening forms including the SF-85 and SF-86.

The administrative rescheduling review begun in late 2022 by the Biden administration continued in 2023. Although the science review was confirmed to be in process circa March, Health and Human Services secretary Xavier Becerra would not commit to having the science review complete by 4/20, 2023.

=== Policy discussions ===
The National Cannabis Policy Summit at the U.S. Capitol on April 20, 2023 discussed legislative changes to cannabis law then under contemplation.

== State legislation and initiatives ==
Kind Idaho was gathering signatures for a medical cannabis legalization initiative at the end of 2022.

Oklahoma State Question 820 concerning adult-use legalization was on the ballot for the March 7, 2023 special election, after missing the 2022 deadline.

West Virginia House Bill 2091, legalization, was introduced on January 11, the first day of the legislative session.

Washington S.B. 5123 "Concerning the employment of individuals who lawfully consume cannabis" was heard in Senate Labor & Commerce Committee, mid January. The state senate passed the bill on February 22. The house passed an amended version of the senate bill on March 29.

Kentucky Senate Bill 47 to create a medical cannabis program was passed by the state legislature on March 30, and sent to the governor to be signed into law.

Minnesota HF 100 legalizing adult use was filed in January and immediately endorsed by governor Tim Walz. The bill was advanced by the House Commerce Committee on January 11 following a hearing on it, and passed 71-59 on April 25. The state senate passed a matching bill 34-33 on April 28. The legislature passed a reconciled version of the bill on May 20 and sent it to the governor to become law.

In Hawaii, a "dual use" task force was authorized by the state legislature in 2021 to study and recommend options for legalization "to the legislature no later than twenty days prior to the convening of the regular session of 2023". In the second half of 2022, Hawaii lawmaker Ryan Yamane and other members of the task force met with industry leaders and activists to plan legalization efforts to occur during the 2023 legislative session. The task force sent its report to the legislature in December 2022. In January 2023, Jeanné Kapela announced her intention to introduce a legalization bill in the 2023 session. Senate Bill 375, creating a legal adult-use market under the Hawaiʻi Cannabis Authority, was approved by its first committee on February 16. Senate Bill 669, legalization of possession for adult use, was introduced in February.

South Carolina H 3561 to decriminalize cannabis was introduced on January 10. Competing medical cannabis bills, the South Carolina Compassionate Care Act and the Put Patients First Act, both with bipartisan sponsorship, were also pre-filed in January for consideration during the 2023 session. H. 3486, Compassionate Care Act was filed on January 10.

Iowa Senate File 73, legalization, was introduced in January. A house bill was introduced on February 21.

Free All Cannabis for Tennesseans Act, Tennessee SB 0168 and HB0085, legalization, was introduced in January.

Delaware HB1, a legalization bill, and HB2, to regulate and tax sales, were passed through the General Assembly on March 28 and sent to the governor to become law.

The New Hampshire legislature held hearings on a legalization and regulated sales bill in January. House Bill 360 passed in the House by voice vote on March 16. HB360 legalizes cannabis in the state, without new taxes or regulations.

The Virginia Senate passed SB1133, a legalized sales bill, on February 7.

In Louisiana, a suite of bills to enact legalization and regulation was prefiled in February: HB-17, HB-24, and HB-12.

Kansas House Bill 2363, amnesty or effective decriminalization, was introduced in February. Kansas House Bill 2367, adult-use legalization and regulation, was also introduced in February.

Texas SB 209 and HB 1831, adult-use legalization and regulation, were introduced or read for the first time in 2023. SJR 22 and companion bills HJR 91 and HJR 89 were introduced, and if enacted would refer to the voters a constitutional amendment legalizing cannabis. House Bill 1937 would allow cities and counties to opt-in to legalization. House Bill 218, decriminalization and expungement of past offenses, was passed by the house 87-59 on April 27. Texas HB 1805 was introduced on March 13, and would replace the THC percentage cap for cannabis oil under the Texas Compassionate Use Act with a 10 mg "volumetric dose" limit instead. It was approved by the House Public Health Committee unanimously on March 20. The house passed HB 1805 on April 11.

Idaho Medical Cannabis Act, House Bill 370, was introduced as a personal bill (outside of committees) on March 24 by John Vander Woude (R).

North Carolina Senate Bill 3, medical cannabis, passed by 36-10 on March 1. House Bill 626, legalization, was filed on April 17.

Ohio HB 168, the Ohio Adult Use Act (adult use legalization) was introduced on May 22 by representative Jamie Callender (R) and Casey Weinstein (D).

Around June 1, Florida officials announced that they had validated enough signatures on the 2024 Florida marijuana legalization initiative for the measure to qualify for the 2024 ballot.

Pennsylvania Senate Bill 846, adult-use legalization, was introduced by senators Dan Laughlin (R) and Sharif Street (D) on July 6.

On August 16, the Ohio Secretary of State validated 2023 Ohio Issue 2, then called the Regulate Cannabis Like Alcohol initiative, for the November 7, 2023 general ballot. The initiative was passed by voters on November 7, 2023.

== Tribal laws ==
The Eastern Band of Cherokee passed a legalization referendum that was on the September 7, 2023 ballot. It will affect tribal enforcement within the Qualla Boundary, in Western North Carolina, after enactment of corresponding law by the tribal council.
