= South Dakota Initiated Measure 27 =

Initiated Measure 27
- November 8, 2022
- Marijuana Legalization Initiative

Results
Choice	Votes	%
Yes	163,584	47.08%
No	183,879	52.92%
Valid votes	347,463	97.97%
Invalid or blank votes	7,207	2.03%
Total votes	354,670	100.00%
Registered voters/turnout	597,073	59.4%
No
80–90%
70–80%
60–70%
50–60%
Yes
80–90%
70–80%
60–70%
50–60%

South Dakota Initiated Measure 27 was a 2022 voter initiative to legalize non-medical cannabis in the U.S. state of South Dakota. The initiative was certified by the South Dakota Secretary of State for the 2022 ballot on May 25, 2022. South Dakotans for Better Marijuana Laws (SDBML) organized the petition drive, and it was opposed by Protecting South Dakota Kids.

The initiative received a 52.92% no vote in the November 2022 election, and did not become law.

== See also ==
- Cannabis in South Dakota
- List of 2022 United States cannabis reform proposals
