= Kush Gods =

Company which distributes cannabis

Kush Gods is a company based in Washington, D.C., which distributes cannabis. The company leverages a gray area in the D.C. cannabis law under which it is legal to gift and consume cannabis, but not to sell it. The company accepts donations from customers, who are generally rewarded with edible or herbal cannabis. The company was founded in 2015 by Nicholas Paul Cunningham.

Cunningham and an employee were arrested by D.C. Police in 2015 and charged with misdemeanor distribution of marijuana. He argued in his defense that he had not violated laws against sale, but was gifting the cannabis.
