= Medical Marijuana and Cannabidiol Research Expansion Act =

2022 Act of the United States Congress

- Long title: To expand research on cannabidiol and marijuana, and for other purposes.
- Enacted by: the 117th United States Congress
- Effective: December 2, 2022

Citations
- Public law: Pub. L. 117–215 (text) (PDF)
- Statutes at Large: 136 Stat. 2257

Legislative history
- Introduced in the House as H.R. 8454 by Earl Blumenauer (D–OR) on July 21, 2022; Passed the House on July 26, 2022 (325–95); Passed the Senate on November 16, 2022 (voice vote); Signed into law by President Joe Biden on December 2, 2022

The Medical Marijuana and Cannabidiol Research Expansion Act is an Act of Congress allowing medical research on cannabis. The act is "the first standalone marijuana-related bill approved by both chambers of the United States Congress".

== History ==
The bill was introduced in the Senate February 4, 2021, by Senators Dianne Feinstein (D) of California, Brian Schatz (D) of Hawaii, and Chuck Grassley (R) of Iowa as S.253; it was forwarded unanimously by the Senate Committee on the Judiciary and passed by Senate unanimously on March 24, 2022. A new bill with minor changes was introduced in House on July 21, 2022, by four Republicans and two Democrats; Rep. Earl Blumenauer of Oregon was the lead sponsor. It was passed by House under suspension of the rules 395-25 five days later. On November 16, 2022, the Senate passed the House bill by voice vote and sent it to the President to be signed into law. President Biden signed the bill into law on December 2, 2022.

== Provisions ==
The act requires the Drug Enforcement Administration to register researchers and suppliers of cannabis for medical research in a timely manner, who will then be able to legally manufacture, distribute, dispense and possess the substance. It also creates a mechanism for FDA approval of drugs derived from the cannabis plant and "[p]rotects doctors who may now discuss the harms and benefits of using cannabis and cannabis derivatives." (Note: Title III states "It shall not be a violation of the Controlled Substances Act (21 U.S.C. 801 et seq.) for a State-licensed physician to discuss—(1) the currently known potential harms and benefits of marijuana derivatives, including cannabidiol, as a treatment with the legal guardian of the patient of the physician if the patient is a child; or (2) the currently known potential harms and benefits of marijuana and marijuana derivatives, including cannabidiol, as a treatment with the patient or the legal guardian of the patient of the physician if the patient is a legal adult.") It also requires the Department of Health and Human Services to investigate the medical utility of cannabis and barriers that exist to conducting research, and requires the Attorney General to conduct an annual review to ensure that cannabis is being adequately produced for research purposes.

== See also ==
- List of 2022 United States cannabis reform proposals
- Cannabis policy of the Joe Biden administration
