= SAFE Banking Act =

U.S bill regarding cannabis businesses and banking

- Long title: An Act to protections for depository institutions that provide financial services to cannabis-related legitimate businesses and service providers for such businesses, and for other purposes.
- Announced in: the 118th United States Congress

Legislative history
- Introduced in the House of Representatives as H.R. 2891 by David Joyce (R–OH) on April 26, 2023; Committee consideration by Financial Services, Judiciary

The SAFE Banking Act, officially H.R. 1595, full title Secure and Fair Enforcement (SAFE) Act, also referred to as the SAFE Banking Act of 2019, and as of 2023 the Secure and Fair Enforcement Regulation (SAFER) Banking Act, is proposed legislation regarding disposition of funds gained through the cannabis industry in the United States.

== History ==
=== 116th Congress ===
On March 7, 2019, the bill was introduced in U.S. House of Representatives by Ed Perlmutter (D-CO) and was referred to the Judiciary and Financial Services Committees. On March 28, 2019, the Financial Services Committee voted 45 to 15 to advance the bill to the full House.

The bill had "broad bipartisan support", and there were 152 cosponsors at the time of the committee vote – over a third of the entire House. Perlmutter, along with Washington Representative Denny Heck, "have introduced similar bills every Congress since 2013". On April 11, 2019, Oregon Senator Jeff Merkley introduced a companion bill in the U.S. Senate and the bill was referred to the Senate Banking, Housing, and Urban Affairs Committee. On June 6, 2019, the House bill moved out of committee and was placed on the Union Calendar for a vote.

As of September 18, 2019, the House bill had 206 cosponsors (including U.S. House Judiciary Committee Chair Jerry Nadler and U.S. House Financial Services Committee Chair Maxine Waters), and the Senate bill had 33 cosponsors (including Senate Minority Whip Dick Durbin).

On September 20, 2019, House Majority Leader Steny Hoyer announced the bill was scheduled for a floor vote for the week of September 23 under suspension of the rules. Under suspension of House rules, the bill may not be amended, and must be approved by two thirds of the House of Representatives.

The bill was passed by the House on September 25, 2019.

The bill was originally drafted exclusively with banking institutions within its scope. However, the National Association of Professional Insurance Agents and other lobbying organizations achieved the addition of language from the "Clarifying Law Around Insurance of Marijuana" (CLAIM) Act, which existed in similar versions in both the House and the Senate. The added language rules out criminal and civil prosecution for both the entities and their employees or officers for the business of insuring cannabis-related industry when such industry is located in states which have legalized such activity.

The SAFE Banking Act provisions were included in the HEROES Act, a COVID-19 relief bill passed in the U.S. House in May 2020. They were again included in a bill approved by the house 214–207 in October. A push to include the SAFE Banking Act provisions in the end-of-year COVID-19 stimulus failed, though hope remained it could pass in 2021 if reintroduced.

=== 117th Congress ===
The SAFE Banking Act was reintroduced in the 117th Congress in 2021 by a bipartisan group of over 100 members of the House. In late October 2022, Senate Majority Leader Chuck Schumer said a bill in his chamber was "very close". The Senate bill had additional provisions regarding expungements and was being called "SAFE Banking Plus". Industry publication Marijuana Business Daily asserted that SAFE Banking Plus was likely to be on the agenda in the lame-duck session following the November elections, as did Dow Jones' MarketWatch, while Kiplinger's Personal Finance said it had "some probability" of passage. In late November, Beacon Policy Advisors and Cowen Washington Research Group gave it a 70 and 75% chance of passage respectively.

In early December it was reported that Majority Leader Chuck Schumer, with bipartisan support, planned to attach the legislation to a "must pass" bill like the 2023 National Defense Authorization Act during the lame-duck session.

==== Amendment to National Defense Authorization Act ====
The bill's language was added to the National Defense Authorization Act for Fiscal Year 2022 (NDAA) by amendment on September 21, 2021. A letter to Congress by a bipartisan group of just one fewer than half of U.S. state governors urged passage through the NDAA. The SAFE Banking provisions were removed from the NDAA prior to its being signed into law on December 27, 2021.

The bill was included in the National Defense Authorization Act for fiscal year 2023 passed by the House on July 14, 2022.

==== Amendment to America COMPETES Act ====
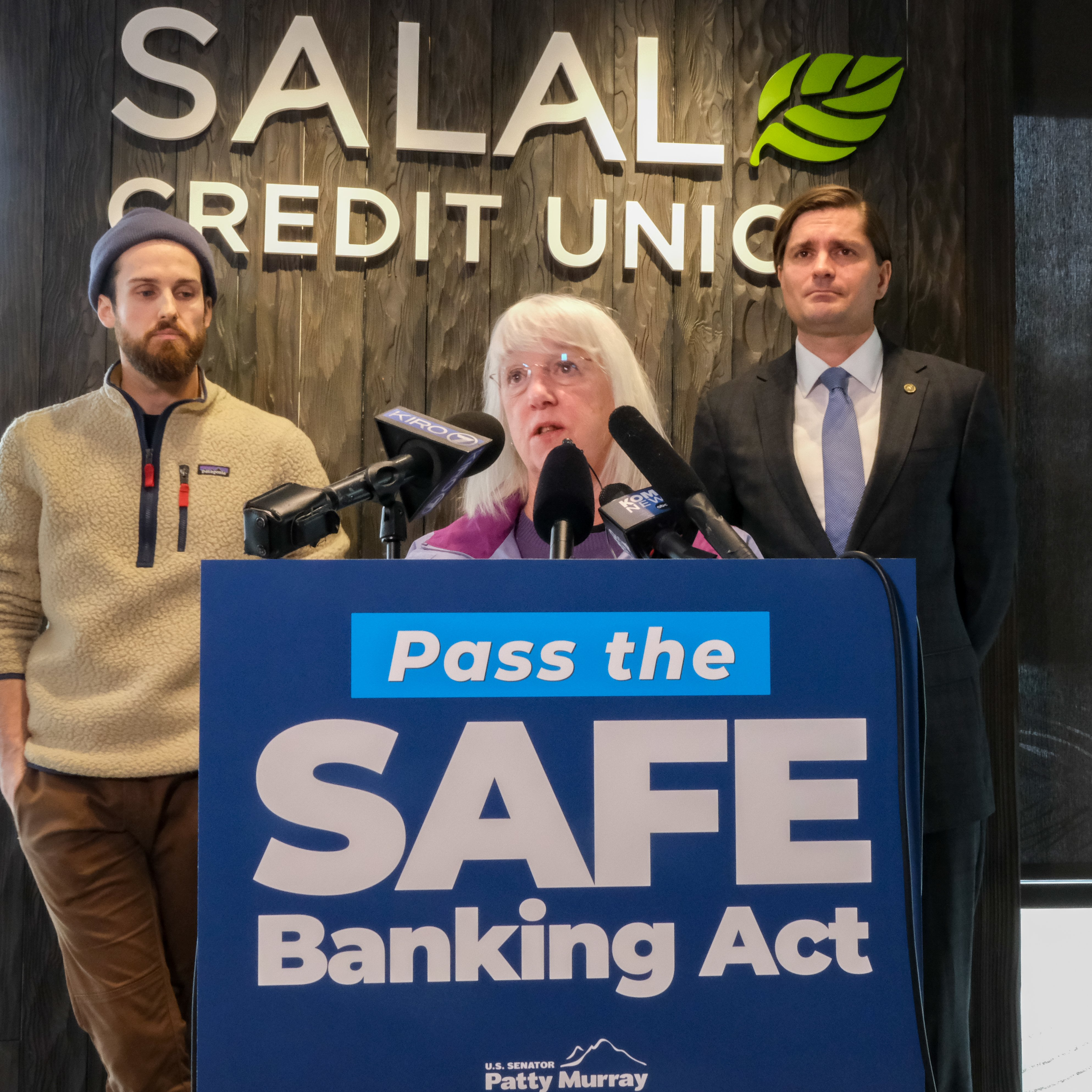
Senator Patty Murray advocates for passage of the SAFE Banking Act on April 20, 2022

In January 2022, Perlmutter introduced an amendment to the America COMPETES Act of 2022 that incorporated the SAFE Banking Act. It was passed by the House on February 4. On April 20, 2022, Senator Patty Murray said that the banking amendment was likely to get passed in the America COMPETES Act "in a little over a month" through conference committee negotiations. Murray became the third-ranking member of the party in control of the U.S. Senate in 2016, and is a member of the conference committee.

=== 118th Congress ===
The bill was reintroduced during the 118th Congress on April 26, 2023 in both chambers. Senators Jeff Merkley (D) and Steve Daines (R), and Representatives Dave Joyce (R) and Earl Blumenauer (D) were the lead sponsors. The Senate Banking Committee chair, Sherrod Brown, said the bill could get a hearing in the first half of May, 2023, and the first Senate hearing was held on May 11. The bill was scheduled for markup by the Senate Banking Committee in June. Politico and other sources reported it was scheduled for a Banking Committee vote on September 27, where it was expected to pass.

Senators including Majority Leader Chuck Schumer introduced a new version of the bill called Secure and Fair Enforcement Regulation (SAFER) Banking Act on September 20. The bill was passed by the committee on September 27, clearing it for a Senate floor vote.

Following the apparent intention of the US government to reschedule marijuana from Schedule I to Schedule III in late April, 2024, Majority Leader Schumer reiterated the need for new banking regulations around cannabis and said he "remain[s] strongly committed" to both SAFER Banking and the Cannabis Administration and Opportunity Act.

=== 119th Congress ===
The bill was reintroduced during the 119th Congress on June 25, 2026 in both chambers. Senators Jeff Merkley of Oregon (D), Lisa Murkowski of Alaska (R), Steve Daines of Montana (R), and Elizabeth Warren of Mass. (D) were the lead sponsors in the U.S. Senate, and Rep. David Joyce of Ohio (R) in the House of Representatives.

== Provisions ==
The following is the bill summary authorized by the Congressional Research Service (CRS) for the SAFE Banking Act, the version which passed the House in 2021:

This bill generally prohibits a federal banking regulator from penalizing a depository institution for providing banking services to a legitimate cannabis-related business. Prohibited penalties include terminating or limiting the deposit insurance or share insurance of a depository institution solely because the institution provides financial services to a legitimate cannabis-related business and prohibiting or otherwise discouraging a depository institution from offering financial services to such a business.

Additionally, proceeds from a transaction involving activities of a legitimate cannabis-related business are not considered proceeds from unlawful activity. Proceeds from unlawful activity are subject to anti-money laundering laws.

Furthermore, a depository institution is not, under federal law, liable or subject to asset forfeiture for providing a loan or other financial services to a legitimate cannabis-related business.

The bill also provides that a federal banking agency may not request or order a depository institution to terminate a customer account unless (1) the agency has a valid reason for doing so, and (2) that reason is not based solely on reputation risk. Valid reasons for terminating an account include threats to national security and involvement in terrorist financing, including state sponsorship of terrorism.

Finally, the bill decreases the cap on the surplus funds of the Federal Reserve banks. (Amounts exceeding this cap are deposited in the general fund of the Treasury.)

== Legislative history ==
As of August 2, 2024:

Congress	Short title	Bill number(s)	Date introduced	Sponsor(s)	# of cosponsors	Latest status
116th Congress	SAFE Banking Act of 2019	H.R. 1595	March 7, 2019	Ed Perlmutter (D-CO)	206	Passed in the House (321-103)
116th Congress	SAFE Banking Act of 2019	S.1200	April 19, 2019	Jeff Merkley (D-OR)	34	Died in Committee
117th Congress	SAFE Banking Act of 2021	H.R. 1996	March 18, 2021	Ed Perlmutter (D-CO)	180	Passed in the House (321-101)
117th Congress	SAFE Banking Act of 2021	S.910	March 23, 2021	Jeff Merkley (D-OR)	42	Died in Committee.
118th Congress	SAFE Banking Act of 2023	H.R. 2891	April 26, 2023	Dave Joyce (R-OH)	128	Referred to Committees of Jurisdiction.
118th Congress	SAFE Banking Act of 2023	S.1323	April 26, 2023	Jeff Merkley (D-OR)	42	Senate Banking Committee hearings held May 11, 2023
118th Congress	SAFER Banking Act	S.2860	September 20, 2023	Jeff Merkley (D-OR)	36 including Schumer	Passed by Senate Banking Committee on September 27, 2023
119th Congress	SAFE Banking Act of 2026		June 25, 2026	Dave Joyce (R-OH)	7	Introduced
119th Congress	SAFE Banking Act of 2026		June 25, 2026	Jeff Merkley (D-OR)	3	Introduced

== Polling ==
A November 2022 poll of over 1,200 likely U.S. voters by Data for Progress showed strong support for many provisions of the bill. Making banking system accessible to the cannabis industry was supported by a 57-point margin.

== See also ==
- List of 2022 United States cannabis reform proposals
- List of 2023 United States cannabis reform proposals
