= National Cannabis Policy Summit =

- Genre: Conference
- Date: Around 4/20
- Frequency: Annually
- Location: Washington D.C.
- Country: United States
- Inaugurated: April 20, 2018
- Previous event: April 17, 2024
- Website: nationalcannabisfestival.com/ncf-policy-summit

The National Cannabis Policy Summit is an event held annually in Washington D.C. since 2018, focusing on drug policy. It is part of a larger National Cannabis Festival, held annually since 2018.

Speakers scheduled to speak at the 2023 event's Congressional Forum, held in the United States Capitol Visitor Center's Congressional Auditorium on April 20, 2023, included the Senate Majority Leader, Chuck Schumer.
