= Military Construction, Veterans Affairs, and Related Agencies Appropriations Act, 2023 =

The Military Construction, Veterans Affairs, and Related Agencies Appropriations Act, 2023 was an appropriations bill in the 118th U.S. Congress.

The House bill, HR 4366, with a $155.7 billion appropriation, was passed by the House on July 27, 2023. President Biden threatened to veto the bill a few days before passage, because it did not include diversity, equity and inclusion funding, and other priorities.

A matching Senate bill, S.2127, was introduced to the Senate on June 22. It was mooted by the November 1 passage in the Senate of the House bill, with amendments making it a $154.4 billion appropriation, as part of a minibus appropriations package. The minibus arrangement was the work of then-Speaker of the House Kevin McCarthy in September.

As of November 27, 2023, the bill is pending House concurrence on the Senate amendments, or further House amendments.

== See also ==
- Consolidated Appropriations Act, 2023
