= San Francisco Office of Cannabis =

San Francisco Office of Cannabis is an agency of the City and County of San Francisco responsible for creating cannabis policy and carrying out its enforcement under California Proposition 64, starting January 1, 2018. It was approved by the San Francisco Board of Supervisors on July 25, 2017. Prior to creation, the office was referred to as the Department of Cannabis or Department of Marijuana.
