= Substance Access Beneficiary Engagement Incentive =

United States Medicare and Medicaid policy

Substance Access Beneficiary Engagement Incentive is a US government Centers for Medicare & Medicaid Services (CMS) policy that took effect on April 1, 2026. The policy allows Medicare and Medicaid covered individuals to receive $500 worth of hemp-derived CBD and THC products annually for medical purposes. At inception, providers were required to be enrolled in ACO REACH program (Accountable Care Organization Realizing Equity, Access, and Community Health) or Enhancing Oncology Model, with later expansion to LEAD (Long-term Enhanced ACO Design) planned. Covered products may have up to 0.3% delta-9 THC.

A federal lawsuit and request for temporary restraining order to prevent implementation on April 1, 2006 was filed by prohibitionist group Smart Approaches to Marijuana. A judge refused to issue a restraining order, allowing the program to go into effect, and scheduled a hearing for April 20, 2026.

On April 2, 2026, the commissioner of the United States Food and Drug Administration (FDA) wrote a letter to subordinates directing exemptions to drug labeling and other regulatory requirements to avoid interference with the CMS program.
