= Cannabis in Maryland =

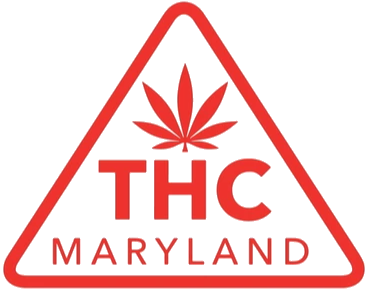
Maryland's THC Universal Symbol

Cannabis in Maryland is legal for medical use and recreational use. Possession of up to 1.5 ounces and cultivation of up to 2 plants is legal for adults 21 years of age and older.

In 2013, a state law was enacted to establish a state-regulated medical cannabis program. The program, known as the Natalie M. LaPrade Maryland Medical Cannabis Commission (MMCC), became operational on December 1, 2017.

A majority of voters approved the 2022 Maryland Question 4 referendum to legalize recreational use of cannabis on November 8, 2022, with 67.2% of voters in favor and 32.8% against. It took effect on July 1, 2023. Under Question 4, adults 21 years of age and older are permitted to grow up to two cannabis plants out of public view, and possess no more than 1.5 ounces of recreational cannabis on their person. Possession of between 1.5-2.5 ounces is punishable by a civil fine of up to $250, and over 2.5 ounces is punishable by up to a $1000 fine and up to 6 months in jail. Additionally, a companion bill triggered upon passage of the referendum included a provision to automatically expunge all cases in which possession of cannabis was the only charge, as well as allow for individuals incarcerated for cannabis possession to petition for resentencing.

== Prohibition and decriminalization ==
In 2010, Maryland had the fifth-highest overall arrest rate for marijuana possession in the United States, with 409 arrests per 100,000 residents, significantly higher than the national rate, which was 256 per 100,000 people. In that year, marijuana arrests made up 49.9% of all drug possession arrests in the state. In Maryland, Black people were 2.9 times more likely than Whites to be arrested for marijuana possession.

In April 2014, Governor Martin O'Malley signed a law that decriminalized the possession of 10 grams or less of marijuana. Previously, possessing such was a misdemeanor with a $500 fine and/or 90 days in jail. The measure made such possession a civil infraction, similar to a traffic ticket. It took effect on October 1, 2014. Under the law, people over the age of 21 who are accused of having less than 10 grams had to pay a fine not exceeding $100 for first-time offenders, $250 for second-time offenders, and $500 for third or subsequent offenders. Additionally, they were required to attend a drug education program.

In 2016, the Maryland General Assembly, controlled by Democrats, passed SB 517, which decriminalized the possession of marijuana paraphernalia (such as rolling papers, pipes and bongs) and decriminalized the smoking of marijuana in public. The measure makes both civil offenses punishable by a fine of up to $500. Republican Governor Larry Hogan vetoed the bill, but the Assembly overrode the veto.

In Pacheco v. State (2019), the Maryland Court of Appeals determined that "the mere odor of marijuana coupled with possession of what is clearly less than ten grams of marijuana, absent other circumstances," is not sufficient probable cause for police to arrest and search a person within the state.

From January 1, 2023, until June 30, 2023, decriminalization was temporarily expanded from possession of less than 1 ounce (28 grams) to less than 1.5 ounces (42 grams), as a civil infraction subject to a $100 fine as provided by House Bill 837, prior to full legalized recreational use of 1.5 ounces or less on July 1, 2023, due to the passage of the 2022 Maryland Question 4 referendum.

== Recreational legalization ==
In the 2010s, there were several efforts to legalize the recreational use of marijuana, but none were successful. However, support for legalization did increase in the state; Washington Post-University of Maryland polls found that 54% of Marylanders supported legalization in 2014, and 61% supported legalization in 2016.

In 2017, legalization was introduced in the state legislature (sponsored by Democratic Delegate Curt Anderson, Democratic Senator Richard Madaleno, and others) to legalize, tax, and regulate recreational marijuana in the state. The bills would have allowed persons 21 or older to lawfully possess up to one ounce (28 g) of marijuana and grow up to six marijuana plants and would impose a $30-per-ounce ($1.06/g) excise tax for cultivators and a 9 percent sales tax for buyers (the same sales tax as for alcohol sales in Maryland). The legislation also contained a provision that would expunge prior convictions for possession of marijuana in those amounts or less. The legislation did not pass.

In 2019, a task force of the General Assembly, the Marijuana Legalization Workgroup, began to consider ways to potentially legalize the adult use of recreational marijuana in Maryland.

In 2021, Delegate Jazz Lewis, a Democrat from Prince George's County, introduced H.B. 32, which would legalize the adult use of recreational marijuana and expunge prior cannabis related convictions. Another marijuana legalization bill that had been brought up in 2021 is SB 708, which had been introduced by State Senator Brian Feldman, a Democrat from Montgomery County. Feldman and Lewis were reportedly working to "harmonize" the two bills.

On July 16, 2021, Maryland House of Delegates Speaker Adrienne A. Jones announced that a referendum should decide whether to legalize recreational use of cannabis and that the House would pass legislation early next year to put this question before the voters. She also formed a bipartisan work group to work out the myriad details that such legalization would entail, from changes to criminal laws to the taxing structure.

=== 2022 referendum ===
In February 2022, Maryland lawmakers filed House Bill 837 in anticipation of voter approval of a ballot question in the November 2022 election; this bill would legalize recreational possession and use of cannabis on or after July 1, 2023. Furthermore, the bill would allow adults 21 and older to purchase and possess up to 1 1/2 ounces (43 g) of marijuana, decriminalize possession of amounts greater than that up to 2 1/2 ounces (71 g), and allow the General Assembly to set a tax rate on the sale of marijuana. This bill would also establish a Cannabis Business Assistance Fund to support equity initiatives for minority- and women-owned businesses. The aforementioned fund would go toward incubator and educational programs to promote participation in the industry by people most impacted by criminalization. The bill would also automatically expunge prior criminal convictions for conduct made legal under the proposed law.

In April 2022, Governor Larry Hogan allowed the abovementioned bill to become law — with no action of a signature or veto to legalize cannabis recreationally within Maryland. Medicinal cannabis was already legal in Maryland. However, another bill that passed the Maryland General Assembly in April 2022, House Bill 1, put the same cannabis policy onto the ballot as an initiative for Maryland voters to implement in the November 2022 election, negating the need for the governor's signature.

Voters approved the 2022 Maryland Question 4 referendum on November 8, 2022, with 67.2% of voters in favor. It took effect on July 1, 2023. Under the new law, it is legal to possess up to 1.5 ounces of cannabis for recreational use, as well as to grow and maintain no more than two cannabis plants out of public view; however, possession of between 1.5–2.5 ounces is punishable by a civil fine of up to $250, and more than 2.5 ounces is punishable by up to 6 months in jail, as well as a criminal fine not exceeding $1,000. Additionally, upon passage of the November 2022 Question 4 referendum, a companion bill was triggered which will automatically expunge all convictions in which cannabis possession was the only charge, and allow those currently incarcerated for cannabis possession to petition for resentencing. The law does not set up a framework for retail sales.

=== 2023 recreational cannabis retail sales process ===
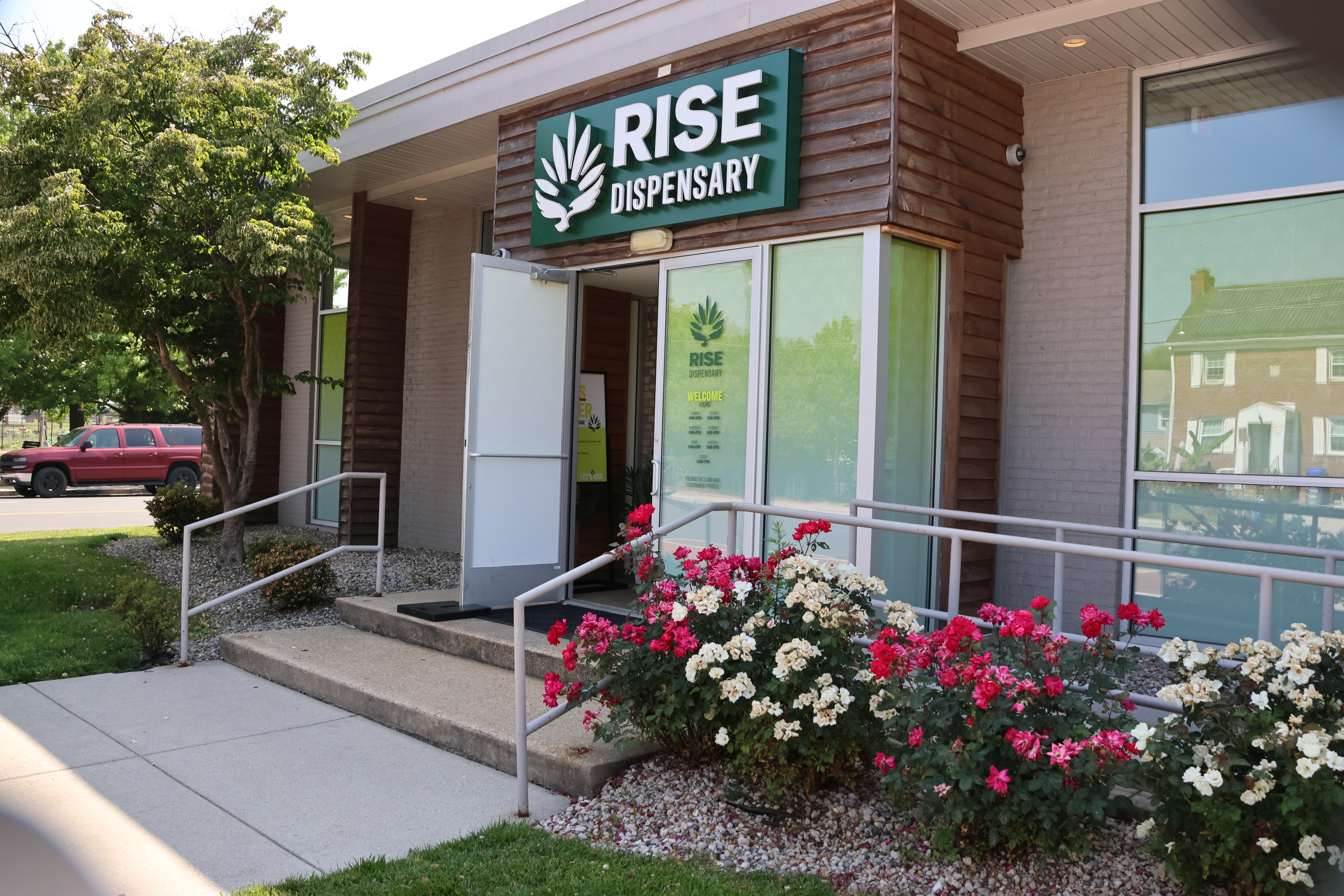
A cannabis dispensary in Maryland in May 2023

On 3 February 2023, The Maryland General Assembly filed a bill in anticipation of the state’s recreational cannabis bill which if passed would allow recreational cannabis dispensaries to open for business on July 1, 2023. This also entails some existing licensed medical cannabis companies paying a “hefty fee” to convert to a license that would allow them to sell cannabis to recreational customers. However, it is not yet known how much companies would have to pay to convert, or how soon they would be able to do so. There will also be dozens of new licenses created. Both chambers reached a compromise bill with 9% tax and other provisions, and a vote was slated for April 10, the last day of the legislative session. On April 8, 2023, the Maryland General Assembly established rules for the recreational sale of cannabis. Under the new rules, people who are age 21 and older will be able to buy recreational cannabis in Maryland from July 1. The legislation also addresses commerce-related issues such as the number and types of cannabis business licenses that will be available. It sets the amount of sales tax those businesses must charge as well. Governor Wes Moore officially signed into law several bills to implement cannabis legalization and sales.

As of September 2023, the Maryland Cannabis Administration (MCA) has issued cannabis dispensary licenses to 101 entities. In July 2023, Maryland's first month of regulated adult-use cannabis sales, retailers reported nearly $85 million in sales.

== Medical cannabis ==
On May 22, 2003, Governor Bob Ehrlich signed a bill into a law that took effect on October 1, 2003, that instituted a maximum fine of $100 for people using marijuana for pain relief. However, the legislation did not protect users of medical marijuana from arrest and it did not establish a registry program.

In May 2013, Governor O'Malley signed legislation that established a medical marijuana program in Maryland. The legislation restricts cannabis distribution to academic medical centers, which will monitor patients. In April 2014, Governor O'Malley signed another legislation called House Bill 881, which took effect on June 1, 2014, and allowed for the creation of a medical marijuana infrastructure. By September 2016, Maryland state officials were considering more than 800 applications for prospective dispensaries; under the law, there is a cap of 94 dispensary licenses, two per state Senate district.

In 2016, the Maryland Medical Cannabis Commission awarded 15 preliminary licenses to grow medical marijuana (out of a pool of almost 150 applicants) and a further 15 licenses to process medical marijuana "into pills, oils and other medical products." The commission received almost 150 grower applications and 124 processor applications. Seven companies received licenses to both grow and process. The selection process was controversial because—although the selection process was blinded and applications were ranked by outside evaluators—many successful applicants had political connections. One unsuccessful grower applicant who ranked higher than some successful applicants sued the state, alleging that the commission's reshuffling was arbitrary.

Under Maryland's approach, physicians, nurse practitioners, dentists, podiatrists and nurse midwives may certify patients as eligible for medical marijuana. As of November 2016, just 172 of the state's practicing physicians (about 1% of the state's total number) registered to participate in Maryland's medical marijuana program. In addition, several large health systems in the state, citing the federal law against marijuana, said they would bar their doctors from recommending medical marijuana, including LifeBridge Health and MedStar Health.

On December 1, 2017, after five years of delays, Maryland's medical marijuana program became operational and sales began. At that time, the Maryland Medical Cannabis Commission had authorized 14 growers, 12 processors and nine dispensaries in the state; 550 health-care providers were registered to certify patients as eligible; and 8,500 patients were certified by the commission to buy medical marijuana. Over the next two years, Maryland's medical marijuana sector expanded significantly; by September 2019, Maryland had 18 licensed growers, 82 licensed dispensaries, and 70,000 registered patients, which is slightly more than 1% of the state's total population.

== Legality ==
By state statute, defendants who can prove medical necessity at trial face a maximum penalty of $100. Defendants in possession of one ounce (28 g) or less of marijuana are permitted to raise an affirmative defense to the possession charge if they can prove they suffer from a specific debilitating medical condition. This was made redundant by the legalization of marijuana for personal use on July 1, 2023, allowing individuals to possess up to 1.5 ounces of cannabis flower without fear of prosecution.

In Pacheco v. State (2019), the Maryland Court of Appeals determined that "the mere odor of marijuana coupled with possession of what is clearly less than ten grams of marijuana, absent other circumstances," is not sufficient probable cause for police to arrest and search a person within the state.

== Parent-protection legislation ==
In May 2023, Governor Wes Moore signed a bill into law to legally protect parents who lawfully use cannabis from child neglect penalties. The law came into effect July 1.

== Cannabis odors and probable cause ==
Effective from July 1, 2023, officers cannot conduct a traffic stop solely on the basis of cannabis odor or upon the observation that a personal use amount is in the vehicle. However, the smell of cannabis can be considered as a factor if there exists suspicion of impairment.

== Business license applications ==
From November 13, 2023, Maryland cannabis business license applications have been accepted by the MCA — social equity ownership of at least 65% is required. Interested parties had to complete the Business Interest Form before it closed on November 6.

== See also ==
- Cannabis in Washington, D.C.
- Cannabis in Virginia
