= Cannabis in Washington, D.C. =

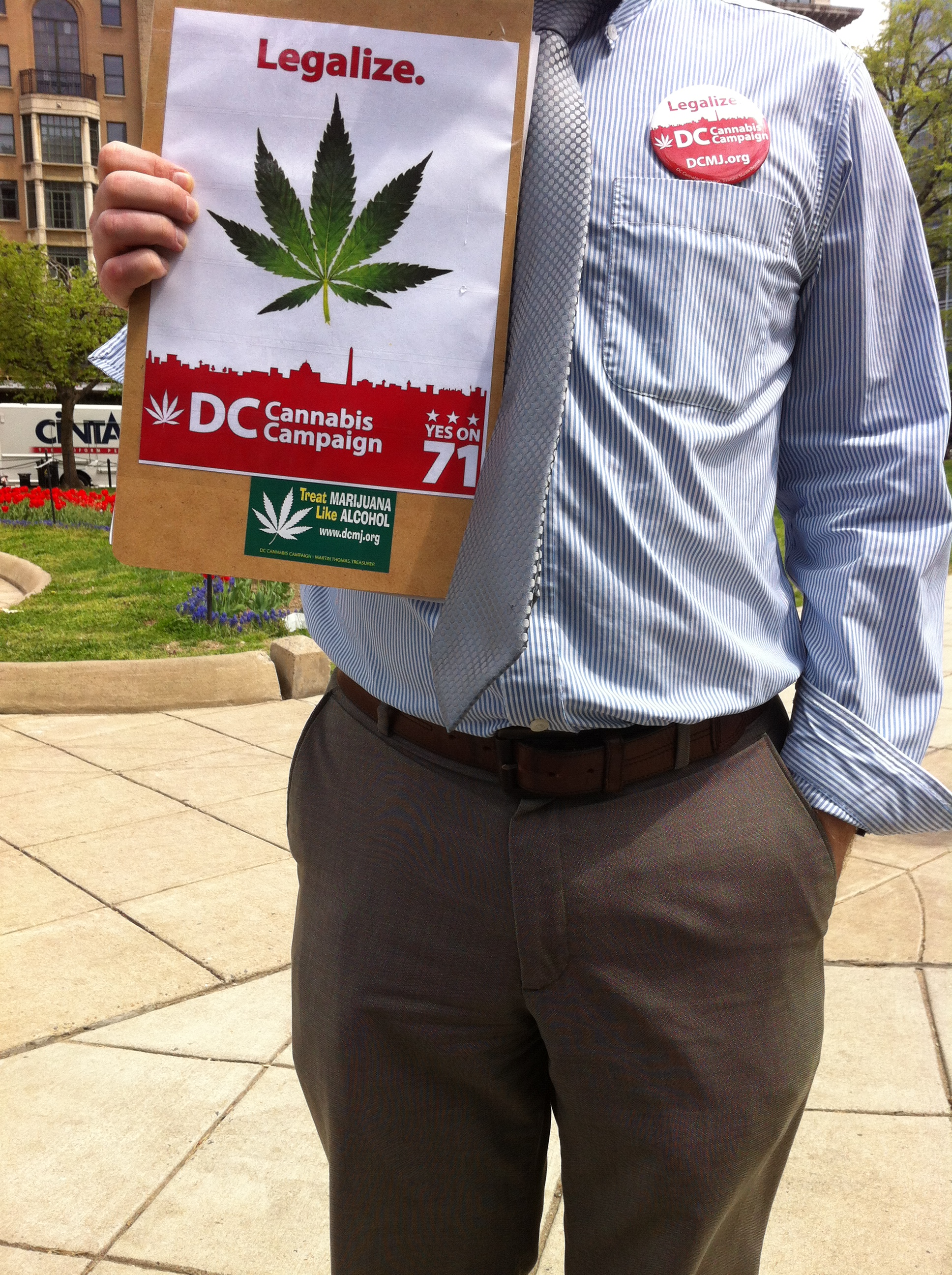
A canvasser for the DC Cannabis Campaign soliciting signatures for Initiative 71

In Washington, D.C., cannabis is legal for both medical use and recreational use for possession, personal use, cultivation, transportation and gifting, and for retail sale once a regulatory system is implemented following an affirmative vote by the residents on a 2014 ballot initiative. The United States Congress exercises oversight over the government of the District of Columbia, preventing the local government from regulating cannabis sales like other jurisdictions with authority derived from a U.S. state.

Although marijuana is legal under District law, the possession of marijuana is still illegal under federal law. Marijuana prohibition is enforced on federal lands, including national parks and military property. The federal government controls about 29% of the District's total land area, about 18 square miles (47 km^{2}), including the National Mall, West Potomac Park, Rock Creek Park, and Joint Base Anacostia–Bolling.

== Restricted to prescription (1906) ==
In 1906, Congress introduced An act to regulate the practice of pharmacy and the sale of poisons in the District of Columbia, and for other purposes, requiring that certain medicines, including cannabis, be limited to licensed pharmacists and prescribed.

== Medical cannabis ==
Initiative 59 was a 1998 Washington, D.C. voter-approved ballot initiative that sought to legalize medical cannabis. The short title of the initiative was "Legalization of Marijuana for Medical Treatment Initiative of 1998". Though the initiative passed with 69% of the vote in November 1998, its implementation was delayed by Congress's passage of the Barr Amendment, which prohibited DC from using its funds in support of the program. This Amendment delayed the start of the medical marijuana program until it was effectively overturned in 2009, with the first DC customer legally purchasing medical cannabis at a dispensary in the District in 2013.

In May 2010, the Council of the District of Columbia passed a bill legalizing medical marijuana. The Congress did not overrule the measure within the 30-legislative-day period, and as a result medical cannabis became legal on January 1, 2011. Though carefully regulated through a lengthy permitting process, dispensaries began opening and cultivation centers were allowed.

== Decriminalization (2014) ==
In a January 2014 poll by The Washington Post, roughly eight in 10 city residents supported legalizing or decriminalizing marijuana. On March 4, 2014, the Council of the District of Columbia decriminalized possession of cannabis. The new law went into effect in July, following the mandatory 30-day congressional review period.

Congress sought to block D.C.'s decriminalization through another rider. On June 25, 2014, House Republicans, led by Maryland representative Andy Harris blocked funding for the D.C. law. The Harris amendment bans the D.C. government from spending any funds on efforts to lessen penalties for Schedule I federal drug crimes. Harris argued that the D.C. law was "bad policy" assessing a fine of $25—a fraction of the $100 fine in Maryland. In response, activists launched the Boycott of Maryland's 1st District, Harris' constituency.

== Legalization (2015) ==
Initiative 71 was a Washington, D.C. voter-approved ballot initiative that legalized the recreational use of cannabis. The short title of the initiative was Legalization of Possession of Minimal Amounts of Marijuana for Personal Use Act of 2014. The measure was approved by 64.87% of voters on November 4, 2014 and went into full effect February 26, 2015.

Under the legalization measure that went into effect in 2015, persons over the age of 21 in D.C. may possess up to two ounces (57 g) of marijuana, grow up to six plants of three mature and three immature marijuana plants in their homes, and gift up to one ounce (28 g) of marijuana to another individual. Drug paraphernalia, such as bongs, were also legalized. The legalization measure allows for the sale of marijuana by licensed retailers but no regulatory system has been implemented due to Congressional opposition. However, the legalization of gifting up to one ounce of cannabis as outlined in Initiative 71, has created a gifting economy, where stores and businesses in D.C. exchange cannabis as a gift with the purchases of items such as t-shirts, stickers etc, which are actually being purchased by customers. Public consumption of marijuana remains illegal.

== Opposition in Congress ==
In mid-December 2014, Congress passed an omnibus spending bill (nicknamed the "CRomnibus"—a portmanteau of omnibus and continuing resolution) that ended the federal ban on medical marijuana, but that also included a legislative rider targeted at D.C.'s Initiative 71. The rider's final language barred the use of funds to "enact any law, rule, or regulation to legalize or otherwise reduce penalties associated with the possession, use, or distribution of any schedule I substance under the Controlled Substances Act (21 U.S.C. 801 et seq.) or any tetrahydrocannabinols derivative for recreational purposes." The final language notably solely used the phrase "enact" rather than "enact or carry out." Delegate Eleanor Holmes Norton said that "she was told by Democratic budget negotiators that the omission was made on purpose to give city leaders a chance to argue that in moving forward, the District is only carrying out, and not enacting, the measure." Norton reiterated this point in an Initiative 71 questions and answers section on her House Web site.

Both D.C. mayor Muriel Bowser and the Council of the District of Columbia took the position that the voter-approved initiative became self-enacting. On January 13, 2015, D.C. Council Chairman Phil Mendelson sent the measure to Congress for a mandatory 30-day review period, in accordance with the District of Columbia Home Rule Act.

On February 24, 2015, Representatives Jason Chaffetz and Mark Meadows sent a letter to Bowser urging her to not move forward with Initiative 71. Congressional Republicans, including the omnibus rider author's Andy Harris, threatened prison time for the D.C. mayor and others involved, suggesting that they could be prosecuted by the Justice Department under the Antideficiency Act, which "imposes criminal penalties on government employees who knowingly spend public funds in excess of their appropriated budgets."

== Marijuana arrest patterns ==
Between 2010 and 2015, the total number of marijuana-distribution arrests made by all police agencies in DC (the Metropolitan Police Department, Metro Transit Police Department, and federal agencies such as the U.S. Park Police and U.S. Capitol Police), declined by 80%. The number of arrests for marijuana distribution and marijuana possession with intent to distribute was 1,378 in 2010, and 234 in 2015.

In 2016, however, more than 400 people were arrested in D.C. for public consumption of marijuana, and numbers remained high in 2017. Arrests for marijuana distribution also sharply increased from 80 in 2015 to 220 in 2016.

== Protests ==
On 20 April 2017, local activist Adam Eidinger and six other activists were arrested by U.S. Capitol Police, during a public event where they handed out free cannabis cigarettes to anyone with a Congressional ID badge. Less than a week later, Eidinger was arrested again by Capitol Police on 24 April, along with three other activists, during a "smoke-in" protest on Capitol Hill.

== Events ==
Washington D.C. hosts a yearly event called the National Cannabis Festival. The festival includes music concerts, an education pavilion, and vendor fair.

== Economy ==
The legalization of recreational cannabis with gifting up to one ounce (28 g) of cannabis as outlined in Initiative 71, has created a gifting economy in which stores and businesses exchange cannabis as a gift for t-shirts or other items such as stickers etc, which are actually being purchased by customers, thereby creating a commercial market linked to selling other objects. This has flourished as an essentially unregulated gray market.

A number of cannabis "pop-ups" have appeared in D.C., hosting events in which donations are accepted and cannabis distributed.

Although D.C. law prohibits the selling of cannabis, a number of entrepreneurs have sought to exploit the legal gray area around the drug. Kush Gods is a local company which accepts donations and distributes cannabis, with a fleet of cars decorated with vinyl wraps of cannabis leaves, while stating that they are not selling cannabis. The owner of Kush Gods pleaded guilty in 2016 to two counts of distributing cannabis.

In January 2018, D.C. police raided the XO Lounge, where a number of vendors were distributing cannabis, and selling items such as stickers or football cards, with the cannabis being given out as a "gift" along with purchase. Twenty-two vendors were arrested and charged with possession with intent to distribute (a misdemeanor), but the charges were later dropped.

== See also ==
- Cannabis in Maryland
- Cannabis in Virginia
