= Cannabis in Virginia =

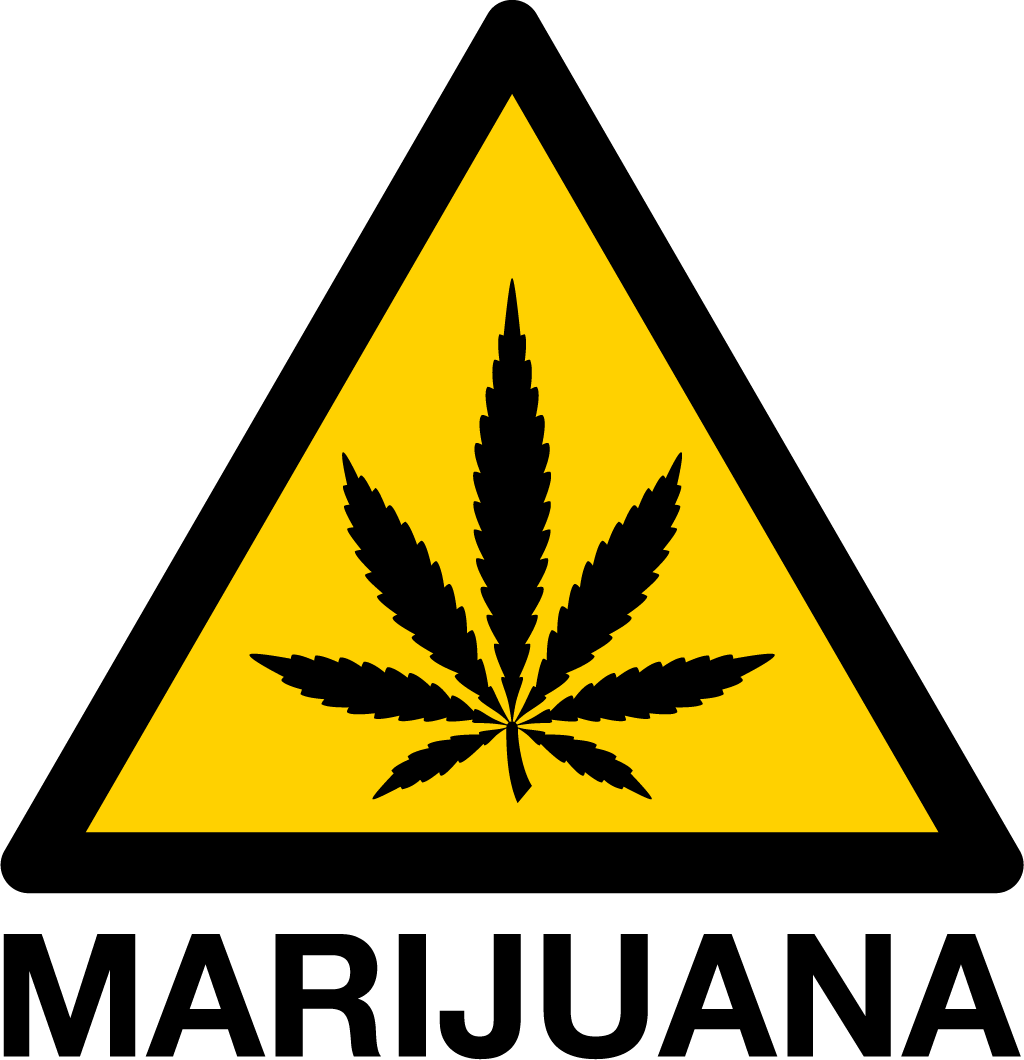
Virginia's THC Universal Symbol

Cannabis in Virginia is legal for medical and adult recreational use. Virginia initially decriminalized simple marijuana possession effective July 2020, and the first medical dispensary opened the following month. Recreational use laws effective July 2021 allow adults to cultivate four plants per household and share cannabis when there is no commercial transaction. As of July 2026, adults can possess up to two ounces (56 g) in public.

While Virginia became the first of the southern United States to legalize cannabis, retail sales have been limited to medical patients. Following approval of new regulations for an adult-use recreational cannabis market, licensed sales are planned to begin July 1, 2027.

== Legislation and history ==
In the 1990s, the Virginia General Assembly tightened the laws on cannabis, but added a provision allowing its use and distribution for cancer and glaucoma. There is currently a provision in the law, § 18.2-251, which allows a case to be dismissed if the offender goes through probation and treatment. In the 1990s, Virginia also had some of the lightest penalties for cultivation in the United States; cultivation of any amount for personal use counted as simple possession (otherwise it carried felony penalties of up to 35 years imprisonment).

Virginia Senate's Courts of Justice committee rejected bills in 2015 to decriminalize cannabis and remove the smoke a joint, lose your license provision in the Virginia Code.

Before July 2020 in the Commonwealth of Virginia, possession of cannabis as a first offense was an unclassified misdemeanor, with a maximum penalty of 30 days in jail and/or $500 fine (or both), and loss of driving privileges. However, with a change in the law as of July 1, 2017, the loss of driving privileges was then optional for adults (depending upon the judge's discretion) while still mandatory for juveniles. A subsequent offense was previously a Class 1 misdemeanor, with a maximum penalty of 12 months in confinement and a $2,500 fine (or both), plus loss of driving privileges. A first offense under this system qualified for a deferred disposition resulting in dismissal. This option required a drug assessment, classes, community service, and either loss of driving privileges for six months or a larger amount (50 hours) of community service. The first-offender program was controversial, because it could affect immigration status and did not allow the defendant to qualify for expungement, and as a result, remained on the individual's record for life.

As of July 1, 2020, possession of less than 1 ounce (28 g) was decriminalized to a civil offense punishable by a $25 fine. One year later, personal use became legal.

== Medical cannabis in Virginia ==
In 1979, Virginia passed legislation allowing doctors to recommend cannabis for glaucoma or the side effects of chemotherapy. In 1997, repeal of the medical cannabis law seemed certain, but did not actually happen. For many years, though, the medical cannabis law was non-functioning because prescriptions were disallowed by federal law, given cannabis's status under the Controlled Substances Act as a Schedule I controlled substance with no accepted medical use. In 1998, the Virginia General Assembly tightened the laws on medical cannabis use and added a provision allowing its use and distribution for cancer and glaucoma.

In March 2015, Governor Terry McAuliffe signed House Bill 1445 and Senate Bill 1235, creating affirmative defense against a possession charge that cannabidiol oil (also known as CBD oil) and THC-A oil for patients who have a doctor's recommendation for those substances for treatment of epilepsy. The bill had passed Virginia's Senate with a vote of 37–1 in February.

In September 2018, the Virginia State Board of Pharmacy approved the applications for five companies to open medical cannabis dispensaries across the Commonwealth. As of September 2023, 1,051 doctors in Virginia have registered with the state to write medical cannabis recommendations. Starting July 1, 2023, doctors, osteopaths, physician assistants, and nurse practitioners licensed in Virginia no longer need to register with the Board of Pharmacy before prescribing medical cannabis for treatment or symptom relief. Also legislation passed in 2019 allowing doses to contain up to 10 mg of THC to patients. There are currently 21 medical cannabis dispensaries open throughout the state.

== 2020 reform measures on decriminalization ==
Following the 2019 Virginia elections, in which Democrats won control of both houses of the General Assembly, Virginia Attorney General Mark Herring called for cannabis to be eventually legalized; he scheduled a Cannabis Summit for December 2019 to address the issues of decriminalization of marijuana, social equity, regulating CBD and hemp products, and pathways towards legalization through legislative efforts.

In February 2020, the House of Delegates voted 64–34 in favor of Delegate Charniele Herring's HB972 to decriminalize personal possession of marijuana. The next day the Senate voted 27–13 in favor of Senator Adam Ebbin's SB 2 with a similar decriminalization scope. Virginia was to become the 27th state to remove the threat of jail time for low-level marijuana possession. On March 8, 2020, the Virginia House of Delegates and Senate passed legislation on a marijuana decriminalization plan. In April 2020, this bill to decriminalize simple marijuana possession was approved by Virginia Governor Ralph Northam, and the bill took effect on July 1, 2020. This legislation decriminalized cannabis per possession of less than 1 ounce (28 g) of, which carries the presumption of personal use, carrying a $25 civil fine.

As part of HB 972, which was signed by Governor Ralph Northam on May 21, 2020, four members of the Governor’s Cabinet (the Secretaries of Agriculture and Forestry, Finance, Health and Human Resources, and Public Safety and Homeland Security) were chosen to lead a group of government officials, policy experts, healthcare professionals, and community leaders that would examine the effects of legalizing the sale and personal use of marijuana in Virginia. The group was told to submit a report by November 30, 2020.

A report by JLARC or the Joint Legislative Audit & Review Commission found that the retail sales from a legal marijuana market would produce substantially more revenue than the associated state costs. The report found that the state of Virginia would spend approximately $10-$16 million annually on a state regulatory agency, public health programs, and social equity programs. Additionally, the retail sales of marijuana would likely begin in as little as two years. Before this time the state could raise several millions of dollars in licensing fees that would likely offset the majority of the cost. After the retail sales of marijuana began, the sales tax from the sales would likely offset the remaining cost of legalization. If the sales tax was set to 25 percent, the estimated net tax revenue would be between $177-$300 million after operatorial costs.

On November 16, 2020, Governor Northam announced that he would introduce and support legislation to legalize marijuana in the Commonwealth of Virginia. Governor Northam stated that the proposed legislation would need to addresses five different areas of concern, those include: social equity, racial equity, and economic equity, public health, protections for young people, upholding the Virginia Indoor Clean Air Act, and data collection.

Other bills in the General Assembly addressing legalization of simple possession, including Lee J. Carter's HB 87 and Steve Heretick's HB 269, have been deferred to the 2021 session.

== 2021 legalization of recreational use ==
On January 22, Virginia SB 1406, "Marijuana; legalization of simple possession, penalties", sponsored by senators Adam Ebbin and Louise Lucas, was advanced by the state Senate Rehabilitation and Social Services Committee.

On February 3, SB 1406 and corresponding HB 2312 each were passed by the final committee prior to a floor vote in the Senate and House. Both bills passed on February 5, legalizing the use and personal cultivation of cannabis by adults ages 21 and older, as well as establish a regulatory framework for commercial cannabis production, manufacturing, testing, and retail sales by 2024.

Governor Northam said he would sign the bills into law if they reached his desk. Substitute Senate Bill 1406 was passed by the House General Laws Committee on February 11. On February 16, the House passed a substitute Senate bill 55-42 and the Senate passed its bill 23-15, requiring a conference committee to resolve the differences. The vote was said by regional media to ensure that cannabis can be legally purchased in Virginia in 2024, but a conference committee needed to reconcile the Senate's date for legalization of possession (July 1, 2021) and the House's 2024 legalization date. The conference committee reached agreement on a bill on February 27 regarding legalization (including cultivation, retail sales and possession) on January 1, 2024, and the Assembly passed it the same day and sent it to Governor Northam for approval.

As originally proposed, Virginia would have become the second state (after Illinois) to simultaneously legalize marijuana possession and retail sales; other states have legalized possession before the beginning of state-licensed sales. Instead, advocates successfully pressured Northam to amend the legislation to legalize possession on July 1, 2021, arguing that delaying the date of legalization perpetuates injustice.

On March 25, still not having signed the bill, Northam indicated that he was in favor of such a change to the implementation date; he subsequently sent back an amended version of the bill to the Virginia assembly on March 31. On April 7, the legislature took up the governor's recommended amendments in a one-day reconvened session. Both houses of the legislature (including Lt. Gov. Justin Fairfax's tiebreaking vote in the Senate) approved the governor's entire recommendation verbatim; as a result, under Article V, Section 6, subsections (b)(iii) and (c)(iii) of the Constitution of Virginia, the bill became law on July 1, 2021. The law legalized adult recreational use where adults ages 21 and over can possess 1 ounce (28 g) or less of marijuana and also allows for the growth of up to four cannabis plants per household. Retail sales and the opening of recreational cannabis dispensaries was scheduled to begin on January 1, 2024, but a re-enactment clause requiring the Virginia legislature to re-approve the sales provision was not taken up following the Republican takeover of the House of Delegates in 2021.

== Youngkin administration, 2022–2025 ==
During the 2021 election, Glenn Youngkin stated he would not seek to repeal Virginia's recreational marijuana laws. As Governor, Youngkin has not voiced support for recreational sales, and has left the decision up to the state legislature. During the 2023 session of the General Assembly, all bills to begin recreational sales failed to pass with the split Republican run House of Delegates and the Democratic run State Senate. Governor Youngkin pushed for revisions to the sale of hemp derived products, including Delta-8, that would allow them to exceed a two milligram THC cap as long as there is a 25:1 CBD to THC ratio.

Separate marijuana legislation signed by Youngkin in 2022 allows patients to purchase medical marijuana immediately upon receiving a certificate to do so from a registered medical provider. Previously, patients were required to register with the State Board of Pharmacy before they could make such a purchase. This reform was enacted due to long wait times occurring during the registration process. The General Assembly also passed a law in 2022 banning the sale of THC edible products shaped like animals, humans, vehicles, or fruits.

A 2023 report by New Frontier Data estimated that $2.4 billion worth of cannabis would be sold in Virginia, but 99% of that will be sold illegally, due to the lacking recreational sales. In July, 2023, the commissioner of the Virginia Department of Agriculture and Consumer Services, stated that the Youngkin administration was "not interested in any further moves towards legalization of adult recreational use marijuana".

In 2024, following Democrats taking control of the state legislature in the 2023 elections, they introduced legislation to begin recreational sales. The proposed legislation would allow medical dispensaries to begin recreational sales on July 1, 2024, with broader sales beginning July 1, 2025. However, the bill would need to survive a veto by Governor Youngkin. In January, Youngkin again stated that he did not have "a lot of interest in pressing forward with marijuana legislation."

The House and the Senate passed a bill to allow legal recreational sales to commence on May 1, 2025 with a tax rate of 11.625%. Governor Youngkin vetoed the bill on March 28, 2024, saying it "endangers Virginians' health and safety."

During the 2025 legislative session, Virginia Democrats again passed a bill "to create a regulated and taxed cannabis marketplace". Youngkin vetoed the bill on March 24, 2025, using the same rationale as his 2024 veto.

== Spanberger administration, 2026–present ==
Following the election of Democrat Abigail Spanberger in the 2025 Virginia gubernatorial election, the establishment of a retail market in Virginia was viewed as highly likely due to Spanberger's stated supported for legalizing recreational cannabis sales and Democrats maintaining their majorities in both chambers. In the 2026 legislative session, both houses of the Virginia legislature passed companion bills to legalize retail cannabis sales, with some differences between the two versions (such as the effective date for retail sales beginning). Following a reconciliation period, the two chambers agreed to a bill starting legal recreational sales in 2027 with a state tax of 6%.

Governor Spanberger subsequently sent the bill back to the legislature with several amendments, which would have delayed the launch of retail sales from January to July 2027 and increased penalties for public consumption of marijuana. The legislature voted to reject her amendments on April 22, 2026, and the Governor vetoed the original legislation in May. Spanberger pledged to revisit the issue, and announced a deal in June. Provisions regulating recreational marijuana sales were subsequently enacted in the annual budget legislation, with sales planned to begin July 1, 2027.

Administrative responsibility for regulating intoxicating hemp products also shifted during 2026. The Virginia Cannabis Control Authority (CCA) assumed the hemp program from the Office of Hemp Enforcement at the Virginia Department of Agriculture and Consumer Services (VDACS) over the course of the summer, with existing Hemp Product Retail Facility Registrations remaining valid until their expiration. As amended in 2026, the Cannabis Control Act directs the CCA's board of directors to "control the possession, sale, transportation, and delivery of marijuana, marijuana products, and regulated hemp products." Companion legislation also authorized the CCA to issue notices of violation and orders to cease unlicensed cannabis and hemp activity, to seek civil penalties, and to operate an anonymous tip line for reports of illicit retail practices. The statutory registration and civil-penalty scheme for regulated hemp product retail facilities nonetheless remains in Title 3.2 and administered by the Commissioner of Agriculture and Consumer Services until its repeal on July 1, 2027.

The 2026 legislation also narrowed the statutory definition of a "hemp product." Under the definition in force since 2023, a product offered for retail sale could exceed two milligrams of total tetrahydrocannabinol (THC) per package if it contained an amount of cannabidiol "no less than 25 times greater than the amount of total tetrahydrocannabinol." Effective August 15, 2026, that "25:1" ratio alternative was removed from the parallel definitions in § 3.2-4112 and § 4.1-600, leaving a flat ceiling of two milligrams of total THC per package for any product sold as a hemp product in Virginia; the civil penalty provision at § 3.2-4126 was conformed to match. Violations carry a civil penalty of up to $10,000 for each day a violation occurs. Because products lawful before that date became unsalable on it, the change was described as a compliance cliff for existing hemp retailers and manufacturers.

On July 31, 2026, seven hemp businesses filed suit in the United States District Court for the Western District of Virginia seeking to block enforcement of the new limit, naming Spanberger, attorney general Jay Jones, CCA officials, and several commonwealth's attorneys as defendants and asserting takings, due process, and equal protection claims.

== See also ==
- Taylor v. United States (2016)
- Cannabis in Washington, D.C.
- Cannabis in Maryland
