= Cannabis Administration and Opportunity Act =

Proposed bill in the United States Congress

- Long title: A bill to decriminalize and deschedule cannabis, to provide for reinvestment in certain persons adversely impacted by the War on Drugs, to provide for expungement of certain cannabis offenses, and for other purposes.
- Acronyms (colloquial): CAOA

Legislative history
- Introduced in the Senate as S. 4226 by Cory Booker (D–NJ) on May 1, 2024

The Cannabis Administration and Opportunity Act (S.4226 in the 118th Congress) was a proposed bill in the 118th United States Congress to recognize legalization of cannabis by the states. The authors are Senate Majority Leader Chuck Schumer, Senator Cory Booker, and Senator Ron Wyden.

== History ==
=== 117th Congress ===
On March 31, 2021, following New York legalization under the 2021 Marijuana Regulation and Taxation Act, Senate Majority Leader Chuck Schumer announced he would soon introduce a federal bill to deschedule cannabis, similar to his 2018 Marijuana Freedom and Opportunity Act. Sources told Politico and other media that a draft of the bill would be introduced on July 14.

On July 14, 2021, Senator Schumer introduced a discussion draft of the bill.

On February 4, 2022, Schumer said the legislation would be introduced in the U.S. Senate in April of that year. Later in February, Schumer circulated a letter asking other senators to "join the process of perfecting" the draft, and for their support. The bill was said to be likely to be introduced by its sponsors on or around the unofficial 420 cannabis holiday, i.e. April 20, 2022, but it was later postponed to "before August recess".

The bill was introduced in the United States Senate on July 21, 2022 as S.4591. In addition to decriminalizing cannabis at the federal level, the bill would expunge federal cannabis-related criminal records. It would add new funding for law enforcement to go after illegal marijuana operations.

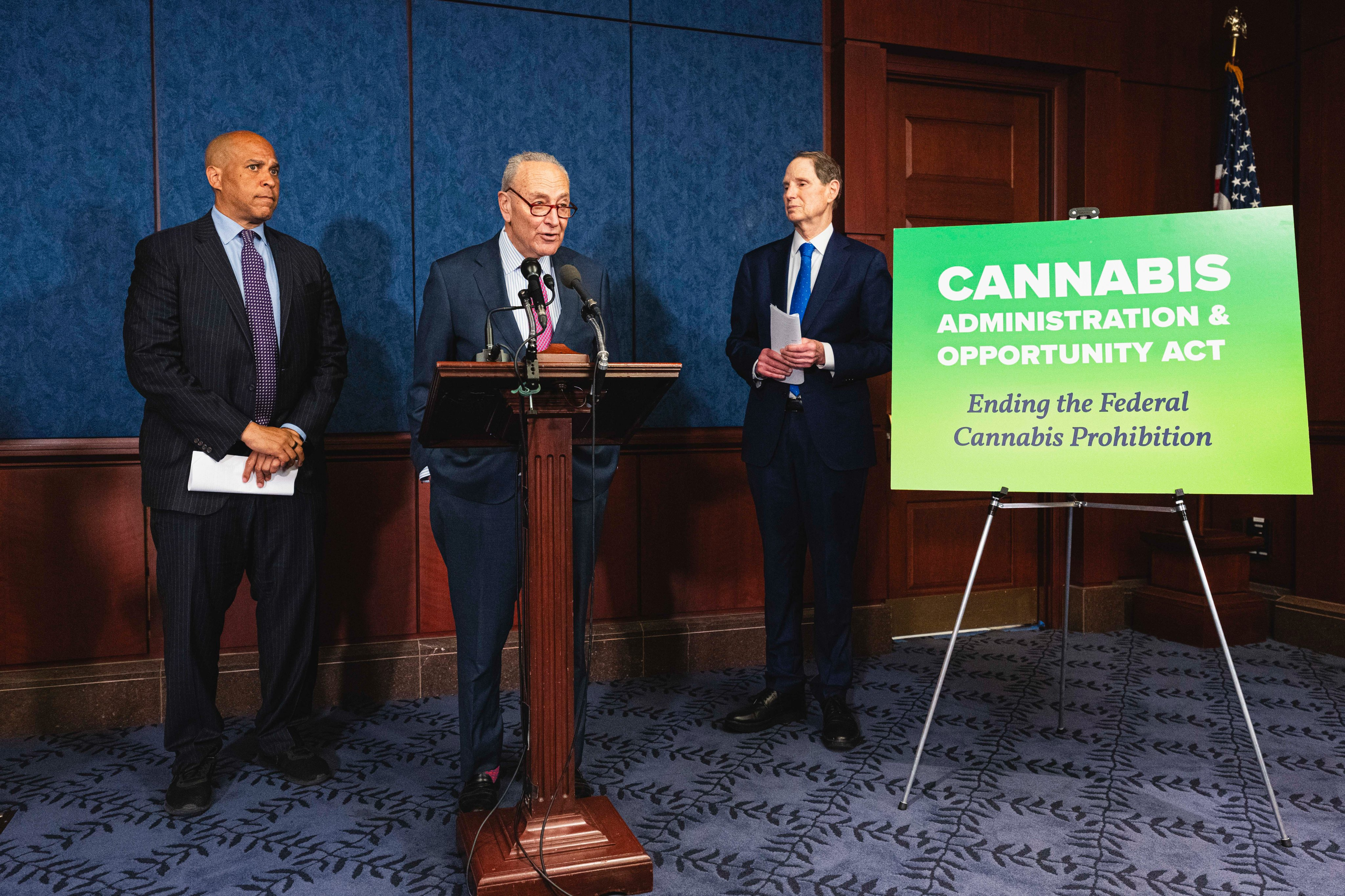
Schumer, Booker, and Wyden at a press conference for the reintroduction of the bill in May 2024

=== 118th Congress ===
In a Dear Colleague letter, Senate Majority Leader Chuck Schumer and others announced plans to reintroduce the Cannabis Administration and Opportunity Act before April 20, 2024. Schumer announced the introduction of the bill on May 1, 2024, and it was enrolled as S.4226 that day.

== Reception and analysis ==
The bill was called by ABC News in 2021 "the first time in history [senators from a major party] introduced a bill to decriminalize marijuana at the federal level and remove cannabis from the federal list of controlled substances" and end federal prohibition. (Note: The Ending Federal Marijuana Prohibition Act had a single Senate sponsor in 2015–2016 Congress: Bernie Sanders, an independent.)

The New York Times wrote that the bill was unlikely to become law, but was significant because "[t]he suggestion that the Senate's top leader and the chairman of the powerful Finance Committee would sponsor major decriminalization legislation would have been fantastical in the not-too-distant past".

The Associated Press wrote that the support of the Senate Majority Leader for ending prohibition "underscor[es] how a once-fringe idea is increasingly mainstream".

== See also ==
- List of 2021 United States cannabis reform proposals
- List of 2022 United States cannabis reform proposals
