= List of 2022 United States cannabis reform proposals =

- 2021 ← → 2023
- Legality of cannabis in the United States (2023)
- Status: Legal for recreational use Legal for medical use Illegal

The year 2022 began with several United States cannabis reform proposals pre-filed in 2021 for the upcoming year's legislative session. Among the remaining prohibitionist states, legalization of adult use in Delaware and Oklahoma was considered most likely, and Maryland, Ohio, Pennsylvania and Rhode Island somewhat less likely; medical cannabis in Mississippi was called likely at the beginning of 2022. At the federal level, "a lack of consensus on the legislative strategy" shown in competing bills with both comprehensive and incremental approaches was said by a lobbyist at the beginning of the year to be "stunting the legalization effort". The likely approaches to legalization were reflected by the Marijuana Opportunity Reinvestment and Expungement Act (MORE), the Cannabis Administration and Opportunity Act (CAOA) and the States Reform Act (SRA), and the more modest less-than-legalization SAFE Banking Act, considered "the least controversial of all the cannabis-reform bills" with "substantial bipartisan appeal".

== Legislation and initiatives introduced in 2021 for 2022 sessions ==
=== State ===
State	Title	Type	Date introduced	Short description	Detail
Pennsylvania	HB 204	Bill	January 21, 2021	Decriminalization	Filed January 21, 2021
Indiana	HB1070	Bill	December 31, 2021	Decriminalization	Pre-filed for 2022 session
Indiana	HB1049	Bill	December 31, 2021	Regulation	Pre-filed for 2022 session by representatives Sue Errington and Chris Campbell. Establishes Cannabis Compliance Commission and Cannabis Compliance Advisory Committee.
Maryland	HB 1	Referendum	December 26, 2021 (bill prefiled)	Legalization	On July 16, 2021, the speaker of the state House of Delegates, Adrienne A. Jones, created a committee to draft a referendum on legalization to place before voters in 2022. Around December 25, the chairman of the state House Cannabis Referendum and Legalization Workgroup, Luke Clippinger, pre-filed House Bill 1 for the 2022 session, to initiate the citizen referendum in 2022 that would create a constitutional amendment to legalize cannabis. The referendum bill and accompanying implementation bill, House Bill 837 received public testimony and were discussed by the House Judiciary Committee on February 14, 2022. House Bill 1 was passed by the house 96–34 on February 25. Senate Finance Committee hearings on the bills began on March 23. The constitutional referendum and the legalization bill were both passed by the Maryland Senate on April 1.
Missouri	2022 Missouri Constitutional Amendment 3 (Missouri legalization initiative)	Initiative	March 3, 2020	Legalization	Passed by voters on November 8, 2022
North Dakota	North Dakota Legalize Marijuana and Allow Home Growth Initiative	Initiative	January 22, 2021	Legalization	On January 22, 2021, the North Dakota Secretary of State approved signature gathering on an initiated constitutional amendment to legalize cannabis, the North Dakota Legalize Marijuana and Allow Home Growth Initiative, which could appear on the November 2022 ballot if 15,600 valid signatures are returned.
North Carolina	SB 711 NC Compassionate Care Act	Bill	April 7, 2021	Medical	Filed April 7, 2021. Would allow cannabis prescriptions for cancer, epilepsy, glaucoma, PTSD, sickle cell anemia, HIV/AIDS, Crohn's disease, Parkinson's disease, ALS or Lou Gehrig's disease, multiple sclerosis, wasting syndrome, severe nausea and "other debilitating medical conditions of the same kind or class". Passed Senate committee on June 30, 2021. Approved by senate on June 2, 2022.
Wyoming	Wyoming Cannabis Amendments	Initiative	June 9, 2021	Decriminalization	
Wyoming	Wyoming Patient Cannabis Act of 2022	Initiative	June 9, 2021	Medical	
New Hampshire	HB 1598	Bill	December 21, 2021	Legalization	Introduced December 21 by Rep. Daryl Abbas, would create ten or more retail sales locations operated by the state as a monopoly. Passed by state house of representatives on March 31, 2022. Defeated in senate on April 28.

Note: Green highlighting indicates passage into law, and may not indicate adult-use legalization.

=== Federal ===
Title	Type	Date introduced	Short description	Detail
Marijuana Opportunity Reinvestment and Expungement Act (MORE)	Bill	May 28, 2021	Federal legalization with regulation, taxation	Passed by House of Representatives on April 1
H.R.5657 Medical Marijuana Research Act	Bill		Medical research	Introduced October 22, 2021 by Rep. Earl Blumenauer; passed by House on a 343–75 vote on April 4, 2022

Note: Light red highlighting indicates voter questions on November 2022 ballot.

== Legislation and initiatives introduced in 2022 ==
=== State, territory, or district ===
State, territory, or district	Title	Type	Date introduced	Short description	Detail
South Dakota	SB 3	Bill	January 2, 2022	Legalization	Legalizes purchase and possession by adults. Bill introduced January 2 by Michael Rohl (R). Cleared Senate Commerce and Energy Committee on February 17 for senate floor vote. Passed by South Dakota Senate on February 23. After being squashed in the House State Affairs Committee, the bill was pulled back on March 1 through a procedure called "smokeout" for a House floor vote. The bill "met its final end" on March 4 when the House voted not to calendar it.
South Dakota	South Dakota Initiated Measure 27 Marijuana Legalization Initiative	Initiative		Legalization	Initiative qualified in May, 2022 for the November 8, 2022 ballot Defeated by voters in November.
Oklahoma	Oklahoma State Question 820	Initiative	January 3, 2022	Legalization	Slated for March 2023 special election
Oklahoma	Oklahoma State Question 813	Initiative	January 5, 2022	Legalization	
Kentucky	House Bill 136	Bill	January 4, 2022	Medical	Introduced on January 4. Passed House Judiciary Committee 15–1 on March 10, and was passed by House 59–34 on March 17.
Kentucky	House Bill 225	Constitutional amendment	January 5, 2022	Legalization	Introduced January 5 by representatives Nima Kulkarni and Attica Scott; if passed by legislature, will be a ballot issue in November 2022.
Kentucky	House Bill 224	Bill	January 5, 2022	Decriminalization	Introduced January 5 by Representative Nima Kulkarni
Kentucky	SB 186 and HB 521 L.E.T.T.'s Grow	Bills	February 17, 2022	Legalization	Introduced February 17 by representative Rachel Roberts and senators Morgan McGarvey and David Yates. Name is acronym from elements of the bill: legalization, expungement, treatment and taxation.
Iowa	Iowa Constitution article XI amendment	Constitutional amendment	January 5, 2022	Legalization	Put forward by state senators Joe Bolkcom, Janet Petersen, and Sarah Trone on January 5
New Hampshire	HB1392	Bill	January 5, 2022	Decriminalization	Sponsors Max Abramson (R), Aidan Ankarberg (R), and Joshua Adjutant (D). Replaces criminal penalty for possession of cannabis and some other substances with a fine of $20 per gram
New Hampshire	HB629/SB 299	Bill	January 6, 2022	Legalization	Legalizes possession and home grow only. Passed in state house of representatives on January 6 with a veto-proof majority. Cleared by committee, scheduled for Senate floor vote April 21. Defeated 15–9 in senate on April 28. Attached as House amendment to SB 29 on May 4.
Kansas	Kansas adult-use and medical cannabis constitutional amendments	Constitutional amendment	January 6, 2022	Legalization	Announced by House Minority Leader Tom Sawyer on January 6.
Kansas	SB 12	Bill	April 26, 2022	Medical	SB 12 repurposed c. April 26 as vehicle for committee reconciling differences between 2021's SB 92 and corresponding bill that passed the House
Mississippi	SB2095; Mississippi Medical Cannabis Act	Law	January 11, 2022	Medical	Passed by the legislature on January 26, signed into law by governor February 2.
Delaware	HB305	Bill	January 12, 2022	Legalization	Filed January 12; passed out of Health & Human Development Committee on January 26. Failed to achieve three fifths majority in House vote, and was defeated.
Delaware	HB371	Bill	April 5, 2022	Legalization	Separate legalization and regulation bills introduced around April 5, after HB305 failed. The legalization bill had enough sponsors for passage when introduced. Passed by House on May 5 and the senate on May 12, then vetoed by Governor John Carney. Although it was said to be "likely" to have support in the legislature to defeat the veto, a June 7 vote to override failed to achieve a majority in the house.
Delaware	HB372	Bill	April 5, 2022	Regulation	Separate legalization and regulation bills introduced around April 5
Missouri	HB2469	Bill	January 18, 2022	Decriminalization	Would reclassify possession of some drugs including cannabis as an infraction
Missouri	Legal Missouri, Fair Access Missouri, and Cannabis Patient Network initiatives	Initiatives		Legalization	All come with expungement
Missouri	Cannabis Freedom Act	Bill	February 15, 2022	Legalization	Introduced February 15 by Representative Ron Hicks (R)
Hawaii	SB2718 SD1	Bill	January 21, 2022	Medical	Changes existing medical cannabis program so that persons age 65 or over automatically qualify for state medical cannabis card. Introduced January 21. Cleared by health committee on February 17.
Arkansas	Adult Use of Cannabis Amendment	Initiative	January 24, 2022	Legalization	Constitutional amendment via ballot question filed January 24. By early July, more than twice the required number of voter signatures had been gathered for November ballot access. On July 29, the secretary of state approved the initiative for the November 2022 ballot. Around August 10, the Arkansas Supreme Court ordered the initiative to appear on the ballot over the objections of the elections board. The initiative failed with a 56% "no" vote.
Indiana	SB324	Bill		Legalization	Authored by Sen. Eddie Melton (D)
Indiana	SB414	Bill		Legalization	Authored by Sen. David Niezgodski (D) and Sen. Eddie Melton (D)
Indiana	HB1311	Bill		Legalization and regulation	Bipartisan bill authored by Rep. Cindy Ziemke (R); co-authored by Rep. Steve Bartels (R), Rep. Justin Moed (D), Rep. Vanessa Summers (D)
Indiana	HB1212	Bill		Legalization	Medical and adult use legalization in the state contingent on federal legislation. Authored by Rep. Jake Teshka (R); co-authored by Rep. Steve Bartels (R), Rep. Ryan Hatfield (D), Rep. Zach Payne (R)
Indiana	HB1232	Bill		Decriminalization (partial)	Authored by Rep. Zach Payne (R); co-authored by Rep. Jake Teshka (R), Rep. Jim Lucas (R), Rep. Sean Eberhart (R)
Indiana	HB1168	Bill		Medical	Authored by Rep. Jim Lucas (R); co-authored by Rep. Zach Payne (R), Rep. Heath VanNatter (R), Rep. Sean Eberhart (R)
Wisconsin	LRB-0250/1	Bill	January 26, 2022	Medical	Bicameral; primary sponsors Rep. Pat Snyder (R) and Sen. Mary Felzkowski (R), creates Medical Marijuana Regulatory Commission
Tennessee	HB1968 Free All Cannabis for Tennesseans Act	Bill	January 26, 2022	Legalization	
Tennessee	SB1973/HB1634	Bills		Advisory vote	Would add an advisory vote to November ballot with three questions asking voters whether the legislature should pass bills allowing medical cannabis, to decriminalize the substance, and to legalize and regulate it. Sponsored by Rep. Bruce Griffey (R) and Sen. Sara Kyle (D)
District of Columbia	B 629 Medical Marijuana Patient Access Extension Emergency Amendment Act of 2022	Law	January 31, 2022	Medical	Introduced January 31, passed DC Council unanimously February 1, signed into law by mayor February 15. Provides for senior citizen self certification of qualifying conditions, and medical cannabis tax holiday on April 15–April 24 (centered on April 20, 2022, i.e. 420).
District of Columbia	Medical Marijuana Self-Certification Emergency Amendment Act of 2022	Law	July 6, 2022	Medical	Signed into law by mayor July 6. Any adult over 21 may self-certify to qualify for medical cannabis.
Alabama	SB 160	Bill	February 1, 2022	Decriminalization	Introduced February 1, passed by Judiciary Committee on February 16
Maryland	HB 837	Bill	February 3, 2022 (bill prefiled)	Legalization	Introduced by Luke Clippinger on February 3. The bill embodies regulation dependent on statewide legalization. HB 837 and accompanying House Bill 1 both received public testimony and were discussed by the House Judiciary Committee on February 14, 2022. Passed by Maryland House February 25; passed by the Maryland Senate on April 1. The state governor announced on April 8 that the bill would become law without his signature.
Maryland	SB 833	Bill	February 7, 2022	Legalization	Introduced by Brian Feldman on February 7; advanced by Senate Finance Committee on March 29
Maryland	Question 4 Maryland legalization amendment		Referendum	Legalization	Question to voters to enact the constitutional amendment embodied in House Bill 1, statewide adult-use possession and use of cannabis. Passed by voters on November 8, 2022. Regulation will proceed under HB 837.
Pennsylvania	Senate Law & Justice Committee hearings	Hearings	February 7, 2022	Legalization	First legislative hearings ever held in the state concerning adult-use (recreational) legalization
Georgia	HB 1400	Bill	February 17, 2022	Medical reform	Increases numbers of licenses, increases Open Records Act access, and removes Medical Cannabis Commission Oversight Committee
California	SB 1326	Bill	February 18, 2022	Interstate commerce	Allows transport of cannabis to or from jurisdictions with an interstate cannabis agreement
Rhode Island	S 2430 and H 7593	Law	March 1, 2022	Legalization	Introduced March 1, 2020 by Senator Joshua Miller (D) and Representative Scott Slater (D). Going into effect October 1, 2022, legalizes purchase of one ounce at regulated retail establishments, possession of 10 ounces in the residence, and use of cannabis by adults. On May 18, committees in both chambers approved their bills for floor votes. On May 24, the bill was passed by both chambers, and it was signed into law May 25. The version of the bill finally passed included automatic expungement of tens of thousands of criminal charges related to cannabis offenses.
Massachusetts	S 2801	Bill	March 31, 2022	Regulatory changes	Fee structure changes, reforms equity licensing, and allows social consumption lounges. Passed state senate unanimously on April 7.
North Dakota	North Dakota Statutory Measure 2 Marijuana Legalization Initiative	Initiative	April 11, 2022	Legalization and regulation	Filed with secretary of state on April 11; on April 22 it was approved for circulation, to appear on the November ballot if 15,582 valid signatures were gathered by July 11. On July 10, organizers turned in more than 25,000 signatures to the secretary of state, and on August 15 the initiative was certified for the ballot. The initiative failed with a 55% "no" vote.
Ohio	House Bill 628 An act to regulate and control adult use cannabis	Bill	April 20, 2022	Legalization	Introduced April 20 by Reps. Casey Weinstein and Terrence Upchurch; mirrors Regulate Cannabis Like Alcohol initiative
South Carolina	HB 7614 420 Day bill	Bill	April 20, 2022	Pardons	Introduced by Rep. JA Moore; establishes official "420 Day" for issuance of pardons related to drug offenses
New York	Senate Bill S9217	Bill	May 12, 2022	Home grow	Introduced by Sen. Jeremy A. Cooney May 12, 2022. Would allow community gardens for cannabis as an alternative to home grow.
Minnesota	HF 4065 May amendments to Health Department appropriations	Bill	May 22, 2022	Legalization	Legalizes and regulates edible and beverage products containing delta-8 THC (synthesized from CBD) or delta-9 THC (naturally occurring). Up to 5 mg of THC per serving is allowed. Called "accidental" vote by NPR, and an "embarrassing blunder" by prohibitionist group Smart Approaches to Marijuana. Took effect July 1, 2022.
Florida	Adult Personal Use of Marijuana	Initiative	August 8, 2022	Legalization	Filed with Florida Secretary of State in August 2022, for 2024 ballot. Would legalize possession of one ounce of cannabis by adults.
Idaho	Idaho Medical Marijuana Initiative	Initiative	August 16, 2022	Medical	Submitted to Idaho Secretary of State in August 2022, for 2024 ballot.
Kansas	Pre-legislative hearings	Bill (prospective)		Medical	Special Committee on Medical Marijuana hearings scheduled to begin October 12
United States Virgin Islands	Bill 34-0345	Bill	December 30, 2022	Legalization	Sponsored by Sen. Janelle K. Sarauw and taken up by territorial legislature who worked through the Christmas holiday to pass the bill by a veto-proof majority on December 30, 2022

Notes:
Green highlighting indicates passage into law, and may not indicate adult-use legalization.
Light red highlighting indicates voter questions qualified for November 2022 ballot or a subsequent ballot.

=== Federal ===
Title	Type	Date introduced	Short description	Detail
SAFE Banking Act	Bill	January 28, 2022	Banking reform	In January 2022, Senator Ron Perlmutter introduced an amendment to the America COMPETES Act of 2022 that incorporated the SAFE Banking Act. It was passed by the House on February 4, but removed later. It was included in the National Defense Authorization Act for fiscal year 2023 passed by the House on July 14.
Climate Resilience Workforce Act	Bill	January 30, 2022	Recognition of state programs	Section 503 of the Climate Resilience Workforce Act, introduced on January 30, contains language effectively recognizing state programs by prohibiting federal testing for cannabis that is "more stringent than any drug test that is in place in the locality or State" in projects funded by the act.
S.253 / HR 8454 Medical Marijuana and Cannabidiol Research Expansion Act	Bill	February 4, 2022	Medical research	Introduced February 4; passed by House 395-25 in July; passed by Senate November 16
HR 6645 Hemp Advancement Act	Bill	February 7, 2022	Hemp regulation	The Hemp Advancement Act was introduced on February 7. It would raise the THC allowed in agricultural hemp, exempt from the Controlled Substances Act under the 2018 Farm Bill, from 0.3% to 1.0% when harvested (retaining 0.3% limit in finished products), and make other adjustments regarding processing and eligibility.
HR 6991	Bill	March 8, 2022	Medical	Introduced by Rep. Seth Moulton, allows VA to recommend medical cannabis
HR 7513 Preparing Regulators Effectively for a Post-Prohibition Adult-Use Regulated Environment Act (PREPARE) Act	Bill	April 14, 2022	Pre-regulation	Introduced April 14 by Representatives Dave Joyce (R), Hakeem Jeffries (D), and Brian Mast (R). Creates commission under United States Attorney General for development of federal regulation. Senator John Hickenlooper (D) said he would introduce a matching bill.
Veterans Equal Access Act	Bill		Medical (veterans)	Proposed in June 15 letter to colleagues authored by Congressional Cannabis Caucus members Earl Blumenauer (D) and Brian Mast (R)
Fiscal Year 2023 appropriations	Bill	June 28, 2022	Recognition of state legalization	Commerce, Justice, Science, and Related Agencies house appropriations legislation approved by committee on June 28 prohibits interference with any cannabis program legalized by a state, territory or tribe or the federal district local government. Similar to earlier Rohrabacher–Farr amendment, but applies to any medical or adult-use program.
S.4591 Cannabis Administration and Opportunity Act (CAOA)	Bill	July 21, 2022	Federal legalization with regulation, taxation	On February 4, Senate Majority Leader Chuck Schumer said that his Cannabis Administration and Opportunity Act (CAOA) would be introduced in April; it was postponed to an unspecified date later in 2022. The bill was introduced in the United States Senate on July 21, 2022.
S.4503 Intelligence Authorization Act for Fiscal Year 2023	Bill	July 12, 2022	Security clearances for cannabis users	Passed unanimously by Senate Intelligence Committee on June 22, containing in section 507 the language that " the head of an agency may not make a determination to deny an individual's eligibility for access to classified information based solely on the individual's preemployment use of cannabis", i.e. a provision that federal security clearances are not to be withheld for prior cannabis use. Introduced as bill by chairman Mark Warner on July 12.
HR 8825 SHIP Act	Bill	September 14, 2022	Interstate commerce	Allows interstate commerce of marijuana and direct shipping to consumers through U.S. mail, pending repeal of prohibition; introduced September 15 by Jared Huffman
House Oversight and Reform committee hearings	Hearings	November 15, 2022	"Bipartisan Cannabis Reforms at the Federal Level"	Subcommittee on Civil Rights and Civil Liberties hearing scheduled for November 15
Medical Cannabis Research Act	Bill	December 29, 2022	Research	Filed by Matt Gaetz for third session in a row.

== Legislation introduced earlier and advanced in 2022 ==
=== State ===
State	Title	Type	Date introduced	Short description	Detail
Ohio	Regulate Cannabis Like Alcohol initiative	Initiative	July 27, 2021	Legalization	Ohio Secretary of State certified over 136,000 valid signatures on January 28, forcing legislature to vote on the measure. May appear on 2023 ballot because of lawsuit over deadlines.
South Carolina	S.150 / H.3361 South Carolina Compassionate Care Act	Bill	December 9, 2020	Medical	Began floor debate January 26, 2022 – the first time cannabis legalization of any kind had been debated in South Carolina. Was passed by the senate on February 10 after weeks of debate. On April 7, the bill was cleared by committee for a house floor vote.

== Executive and judicial actions ==
The governor of Kentucky, Andy Beshear, said on April 7 that he was considering executive action to permit medical cannabis in his state if House Bill 136 was not approved in the state senate. When the session ended without senate consideration of the bill, Beshear issued an executive order that created a committee to provide recommendations on ways forward for medical cannabis.

The governor of Pennsylvania Tom Wolf and lieutenant governor John Fetterman announced a mass pardon program for past nonviolent cannabis offenses on September 1.

The Massachusetts Supreme Judicial Court found in September that requests for expungement of past cannabis offenses, including possession prior to 2018 legalization, are entitled to a "strong presumption in favor" of approval.

President Biden announced a mass pardon for past federal cannabis possession convictions on October 6 and ordered Attorney General Merrick Garland to begin studying reclassifying or descheduling cannabis under the Controlled Substances Act.

Governor of Oregon Kate Brown issued a mass pardon on November 21 for 45,000 persons convicted of simple possession.
