= Mexican Cannabis Institute =

- Instituto del Cannabis para la Pacificación y Reconciliación del Pueblo
- Parent department: Secretariat of the Interior

The Mexican Cannabis Institute (Instituto del Cannabis para la Pacificación y Reconciliación del Pueblo) is a proposed agency of the Mexican federal government, under the Secretariat of the Interior, that would oversee national legalization of cannabis. Its first draft authorizing legislation, la ley para la regulación del cannabis, was shown to the public on October 17, 2019. On November 13, 2020, several Mexican Senate committees (justice, health, and legislative studies) approved an act creating an agency named Instituto Mexicano para la Regulación y Control del Cannabis, or Mexican Institute for Regulation and Cannabis Control, within the Health Ministry, and on November 19, the bill enabling the agency and legalizing cannabis nationwide was passed by the Senate.

Regulation of cannabis in Mexico was required by a 2018 Mexican Supreme Court ruling finding its consumption was a right recognized by the Constitution of Mexico under "free development of personality". Senator Ricardo Monreal told various news sources the measure would be voted on in October 2019. Monreal said the vote was "slowed down" after the October court deadline was missed.

The Supreme Court set a new deadline of April 30, 2020 for the national legislature to enact cannabis regulations, and by a unique "judicial fiat", will have established sovereign state legalization by that date.
