= Illegal drug trade in the Turks and Caicos Islands =

Illegal drug trade in the Turks and Caicos Islands involves trans-shipment of cocaine and marijuana through The Turks and Caicos Islands (TCI) to the United States.

== Developments ==
Then Chief Minister Norman Saunders was arrested in March 1985 together with Commerce and Development Minister Stanford Missick. Saunders was alleged by the US Drug Enforcement Administration to have accepted $30,000 from undercover agents to ensure safe passage of drugs by permitting safe stopover refuelling of drug flights from Colombia to the United States. Video evidence showed Saunders accepting $20,000 from an agent.

Saunders was convicted in July 1985 of conspiracy, though he was acquitted of the charge of conspiring to import drugs into the United States (which Missick was also convicted of). He was sentenced to eight years in prison and fined $50,000.

In 2022, an outbreak of extreme violence, with over 30 murders, was attributed to a turf war between drug gangs looking to control drug trafficking routes.

== See also ==
- Designer drug
- Drug liberalization
- Legality of cannabis by country
- Minors and the legality of cannabis
