= Drug liberalization =

Process of reducing drug prohibition laws

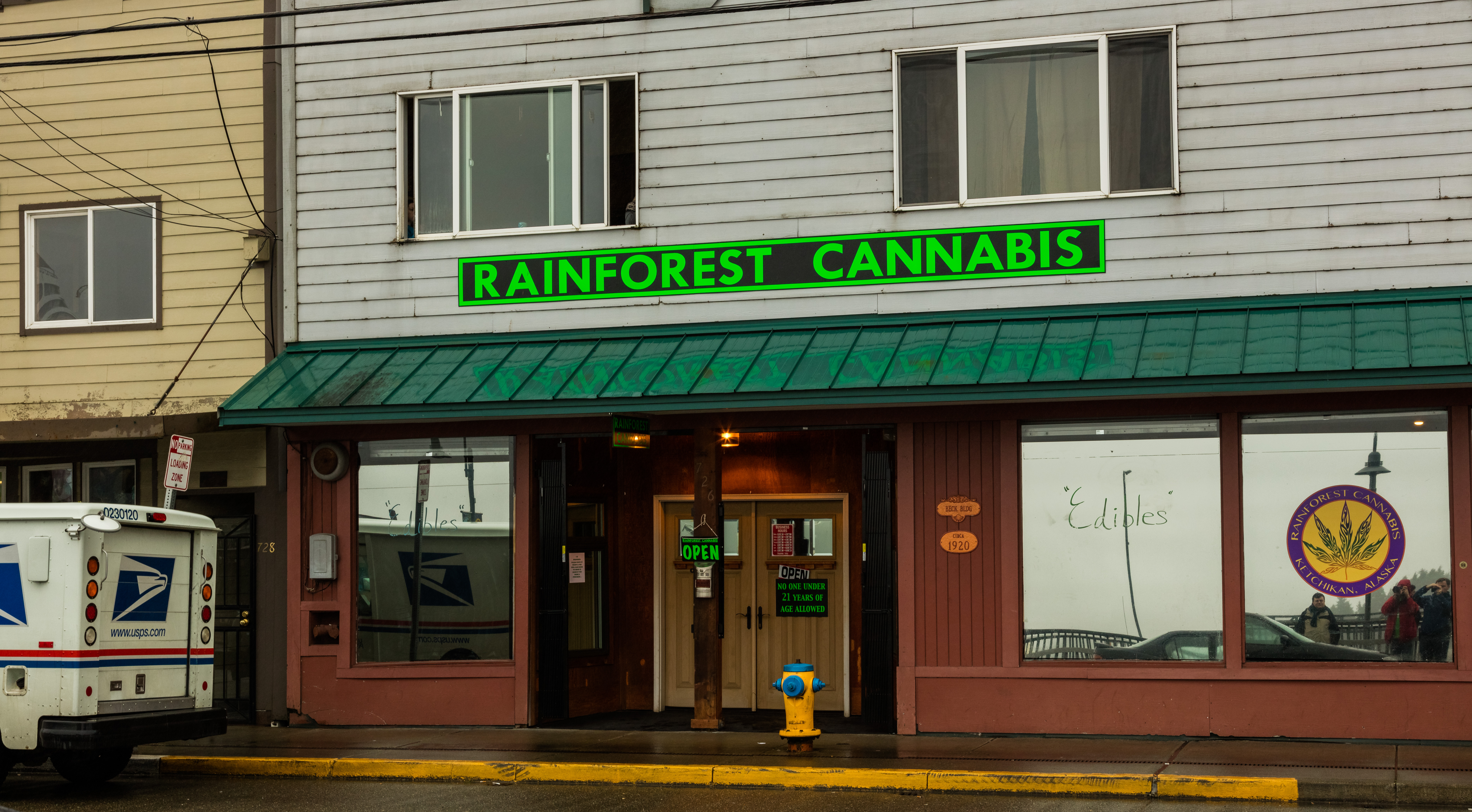
A cannabis shop in Alaska. Cannabis has been gradually legalized for recreational use in many U.S. states since 2012.

Drug liberalization is a drug policy process of decriminalizing, legalizing, or repealing laws that prohibit the production, possession, sale, or use of prohibited drugs. Variations of drug liberalization include drug legalization, drug relegalization, and drug decriminalization. Proponents of drug liberalization may favor a regulatory regime for the production, marketing, and distribution of some or all currently illegal drugs in a manner analogous to that for alcohol, caffeine and tobacco. It is considered a form of harm reduction.

Arguments for and against drug prohibition are plentiful. Two of the most contentious issues are the effects of liberalization strategies on drug consumption rates and its associated harms.

- Studies on the effect on drug consumption rates show mixed results. Depending on the implementation strategy drug liberalization may lead to an increase in the use of certain substances in some user and age groups. In general neither an uptake nor a reduction in drug use has been proven.
- Health and socio-economic outcomes generally improve through liberalization.

Proponents of drug liberalization argue that the legalization of drugs would eradicate the illegal drug market and reduce the law enforcement costs and incarceration rates. They frequently argue that prohibition of recreational drugs—such as cannabis, opioids, cocaine, amphetamines and hallucinogens—has been ineffective and counterproductive and that substance use is better responded to by implementing practices for harm reduction and increasing the availability of addiction treatment. Additionally, they argue that relative harm should be taken into account in the regulation of drugs. For instance, they may argue that addictive or dependence-forming substances such as alcohol, tobacco and caffeine have been a traditional part of many cultures for centuries and remain legal in most countries, although other drugs which cause less harm than alcohol, caffeine or tobacco are entirely prohibited, with possession punishable with severe criminal penalties.

Opponents of drug liberalization argue that it would increase the number of drug users, increase crime, destroy families, and increase the amount of adverse physical effects among drug users.

== Policies ==
The 1988 United Nations Convention Against Illicit Traffic in Narcotic Drugs and Psychotropic Substances made it mandatory for the signatory countries to "adopt such measures as may be necessary to establish as criminal offences under its domestic law" (art. 3, § 1) all the activities related to the production, sale, transport, distribution, etc. of the substances included in the most restricted lists of the 1961 Single Convention on Narcotic Drugs and 1971 Convention on Psychotropic Substances. Criminalization also applies to the "cultivation of opium poppy, coca bush or cannabis plants for the purpose of the production of narcotic drugs". The Convention distinguishes between the intent to traffic and personal consumption, stating that the latter should also be considered a criminal offence, but "subject to the constitutional principles and the basic concepts of [the state's] legal system" (art. 3, § 2).

Drug liberalization proponents hold differing reasons to support liberalization, and have differing policy proposals. The two most common positions are drug legalization (or re-legalization), and drug decriminalization. The European Monitoring Centre for Drugs and Drug Addiction (EMCDDA) defines decriminalization as the removal of a conduct or activity from the sphere of criminal law; depenalisation signifying merely a relaxation of the penal sanction exacted by law. Decriminalization usually applies to offences related to drug consumption and may include either the imposition of sanctions of a different kind (administrative) or the abolition of all sanctions; other (noncriminal) laws then regulate the conduct or activity that has been decriminalized. Depenalisation usually consists of personal consumption as well as small-scale trading and generally signifies the elimination or reduction of custodial penalties, while the conduct or activity still remains a criminal offence. The term legalization refers to the removal of all drug-related offences from criminal law, such as use, possession, cultivation, production, and trading.

Harm reduction refers to a range of public health policies designed to reduce the harmful consequences associated with recreational drug use and other high risk activities. Harm reduction is put forward as a useful perspective alongside the more conventional approaches of demand and supply reduction. Many advocates argue that prohibitionist laws criminalize people for suffering from a disease and cause harm, for example by obliging drug addicts to obtain drugs of unknown purity from unreliable criminal sources at high prices, increasing the risk of overdose and death. Its critics are concerned that tolerating risky or illegal behaviour sends a message to the community that these behaviours are acceptable.

=== The Controlled Substance Act (United States) ===
The Controlled Substance Act (CSA) categorizes all substances in need of regulation into one of the five schedules under the federal law. The categorization of these substances is determined by the potential for abuse and how safe it is to consume. In addition, a big determinant of this is the way in which the substance can be consumed or used medically. In its earliest stages, the CSA was created to combine the needs of two international treaties. These treaties were known as the Single Convention on Narcotic Drugs of 1961 and the Convention of Psychotropic Substances of 1971. Both treaties allowed public health authorities to work with the medical and scientific communities to create a classification system. The Schedule I substances were described as those that have no medical use whatsoever; meaning there is no prescription written for such substance. Schedule II substances are those that can be easily abused and lead to dependence. These substances can only be accessed through a written or electronic prescription from a physician. The schedule III substances are classified as those which have less potential for abuse than Schedule I and II but can still cause the individual to develop a mild dependence. Schedule IV substances are those with the least likeliness for abuse, therefore its medical use is common in the United States. Lastly, the Schedule V substances are those with little to no likelihood of abuse, along with very minimal dependence development.

=== Drug legalization (United States) ===
Drug legalization calls for a return to pre–1906 Pure Food and Drug Act attitudes when almost all drugs were legal. This would require ending government-enforced prohibition on the distribution or sale and personal use of specified (or all) currently banned drugs. Proposed ideas range from full legalization which would completely remove all forms of government control, to various forms of regulated legalization, where drugs would be legally available, but under a system of government control which might mean for instance:

- Mandated labels with dosage and medical warnings.
- Restrictions on advertising.
- Age limitations.
- Restrictions on amount purchased at one time.
- Requirements on the form in which certain drugs would be supplied.
- Ban on sale to intoxicated persons.
- Special user licenses to purchase particular drugs.
- A possible clinical setting for the consumption of some intravenous drugs or supervised consumption.

The regulated legalization system would probably have a range of restrictions for different drugs, depending on their perceived risk, so while some drugs would be sold over the counter in pharmacies or other licensed establishments, drugs with greater risks of harm might only be available for sale on licensed premises where use could be monitored and emergency medical care made available. Examples of drugs with different levels of regulated distribution in most countries include: caffeine (coffee, tea), nicotine (tobacco), and ethyl alcohol (beer, wine, spirits). Since each country has its own regulations and most distinguish between different classes of drugs, there can be difficulties when it comes to regulating which should be more readily accessible, since a particular drug criminalized in one area might be completely acceptable elsewhere. Full legalization is often proposed by groups, such as libertarians, who object to drug laws on moral grounds, while regulated legalization is suggested by groups like Law Enforcement Against Prohibition who object to the drug laws on the grounds that they fail to achieve their stated aims and instead they say greatly worsen the problems associated with the use of prohibited drugs but acknowledge that there are harms associated with currently prohibited drugs which need to be minimized. Not all proponents of drug re-legalization necessarily share a common ethical framework, and people may adopt this viewpoint for a variety of reasons. In particular, favoring drug legalization does not imply approval of drug use.

=== Drug decriminalization ===
Drug decriminalization calls for reduced or eliminated control or penalties compared to existing laws. There are proponents of drug decriminalization that support a system whereby those who use and possess drugs for personal use are not penalized. While others support the use of fines or other punishments to replace prison terms, and often propose systems whereby illegal drug users who are caught would be fined, but would not receive a permanent criminal record as a result. A central feature of drug decriminalization is the concept of harm reduction. Drug decriminalization is in some ways an intermediate between prohibition and legalization, and has been criticized by Peter Lilley as being "the worst of both worlds", in that drug sales would still be illegal, thus perpetuating the problems associated with leaving production and distribution of drugs to the criminal underworld, while also failing to discourage illegal drug use by removing the criminal penalties that might otherwise cause some people to choose not to use drugs.

In 2001, Portugal began viewing use and possession of small quantities of drugs as a public health issue rather than a criminal offence. Drug users are referred to a treatment program by a regional panel composed of social workers, medical and legal professionals. This approach decreases the economic costs of prosecution and the penal system. HIV infection rates dropped from 100 new cases per million in 2000 to 4 cases per million in 2015. Portugal is the first country that has decriminalized the possession of small amounts of any drug, to positive results.

As noted by the EMCDDA, across Europe in the last decades, there has been a movement toward "an approach that distinguishes between the drug trafficker, who is viewed as a criminal, and the drug user, who is seen more as a sick person who is in need of treatment" (EMCDDA 2008, 22). "A number of Latin American countries have similarly moved to reduce the penalties associated with drug use and personal possession" (Laqueur, 2015, p. 748). Mexico City has decriminalized certain drugs and Greece has just announced that it is going to do so. Spain has also followed the Portugal model. Italy recently followed suit, after waiting 10 years to see the result of the Portugal model, which Portugal deemed a success. In May 2014, the Criminal Chamber of the Italian Supreme Court upheld a previous decision in 2013 by Italy's Constitutional Court, to reduce the penalties for the convictions for sale of soft drugs. Some other countries have virtual decriminalization for marijuana only, including in three U.S. states, such as Colorado, Washington, and Oregon, the Australian State of South Australia, and across the Netherlands, where there are legal marijuana cafes. In the Netherlands these cafes are called "coffeeshops".

A scoping review of 55 original studies and review articles on the effects of cannabis decriminalization found 2025 that a majority showed no or mixed mental health outcomes in North America with a prevalence of negative outcomes in the remaining papers.

== History ==
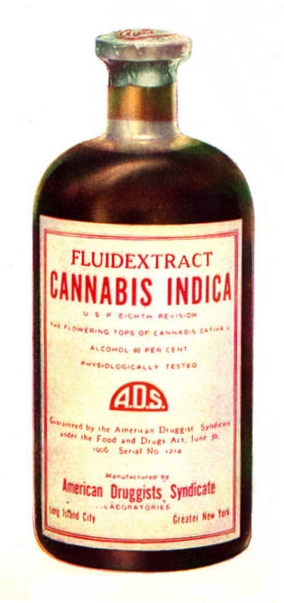
Prior to prohibition, cannabis was available freely in a variety of forms.

The cultivation, use and trade of psychoactive and other drugs has occurred since the dawn of civilization. Motivations claimed by supporters of drug prohibition laws across various societies and eras have included religious observance, allegations of violence by racial minorities, and public health concerns. Those who are proponents of drug legislation characterize these motivations as religious intolerance, racism, and public healthism. The British had gone to war with China in the 19th century in what became known as the First and Second Opium Wars to protect their valuable trade in narcotics. It was only in the 20th century that Britain and the United States outlawed cannabis. The campaign against alcohol prohibition culminated in the Twenty-first Amendment to the United States Constitution repealing prohibition on 5 December 1933, as well as liberalization in Canada, and some but not all of the other countries that enforced prohibition. Despite this, many laws controlling the use of alcohol continue to exist even in these countries. In the mid-20th century, the United States government led a major renewed surge in drug prohibition called the war on drugs.

Initial attempts to change the punitive drug laws which were introduced all over the world from the late 1800s onwards were primarily based around recreational use. Timothy Leary was one of the most prominent campaigners for the legal and recreational use of LSD. In 1967, a "Legalise pot" rally was held in Britain. As death toll from the drug war rose, other organisations began to form to campaign on a more political and humanitarian basis. Drug Policy Foundation formed in America and Release, a charity which gives free legal advice to drugs users and currently campaigns for drug decriminalization, also incorporated in the 1970s. Into the 21st century, the focus of the world's drug policy reform organisations is on the promotion of harm reduction in the Western World, and attempting to prevent the catastrophic loss of human life in developing countries where much of the world's supply of heroin, cocaine, and marijuana are produced. Drug policy reform advocates point to failed efforts, such as the Mexican drug war, as signs that a new approach to drug policy is needed. According to some observers, the Mexican drug war has claimed as many as 80,000 lives.

In 2014, a European Citizens' Initiative called "Weed Like to Talk" was launched within the European Union, with the aim of starting a debate in Europe about the legalization of the production, sale and use of marijuana in the European Union and finding a common policy for all EU member states. As of 30 June 2014, the initiative has collected 100,000 signatures from citizens in European member states. Should they reach 1 million signatures, from nationals of at least one quarter of the member states, the European Commission will be required to initiate a legislative proposal and a debate on the issue.

== Impacts ==
Drug harms according to the ISCD study "Drug Harms in the UK: a multi-criteria decision analysis"

An Independent Scientific Committee on Drugs study found drug harms, such as economic cost, injury, family adversities, environmental damage, and community harm vary between different drugs.

=== Harms to others and society ===
Proponents of drug prohibition argue that many negative externalities, or third party costs, are associated with the consumption of illegal drugs. Externalities like violence, environmental effects on neighborhoods, increased health risks, and increased healthcare costs are often associated with the illegal drug market.

Opponents of prohibition argue that some of those externalities are created by criminalizing drug policies. They believe that much of the violence associated with drug trade is due to the illegal nature of drug trade, where there is no mediating authority to solve disputes peacefully and legally. The illegal nature of the market also affects the health of consumers by making it difficult to acquire syringes, which often leads to needle sharing. Economist Milton Friedman argues that prohibition of drugs creates many negative externalities like increased incarceration rates, the undertreatment of chronic pain, corruption, disproportional imprisonment of African Americans, compounding harm to users, the destruction of inner cities and harm to foreign countries. Proponents of legalization also argue that prohibition decrease the quality of the drugs made, which often leads to more physical harm, like accidental overdoses and poisoning, to the drug users. Steven D. Levitt and Ilyana Kuziemko point to the over crowding of prisons as another negative side effect of the war on drugs. They believe that by sending such a large number of drug offenders to prison, the war on drugs has reduced the prison space available for other offenders. This increased incarceration rate not only costs tax payers more to maintain, it could possibly increase crime by crowding violent offenders out of prison cells and replacing them with drug offenders. According to economist Mark Thornton prohibition increases political corruption and crime.

Prohibition can produce more dangerous and addictive drugs. Milton Friedman estimated that over 10,000 deaths a year in the US are caused by the criminalization of drugs, and if drugs were to be made legal, number of innocent victims such as those shot down in drive by shootings would decrease.

=== Cost of law enforcement ===
A Harvard economist, Jeffrey Miron, estimated that ending the war on drugs would inject $76.8 billion into the US economy in 2010 alone. He estimates that the government would save $41.3 billion for law enforcement and the government would gain up to $46.7 billion in tax revenue. Since the war on drugs began under the administration of President Richard Nixon, the federal drug-fighting budget has increased from $100 million in 1970 to $15.1 billion in 2010, with a total cost estimated near 1 trillion dollars over 40 years. In the same time period an estimated 37 million nonviolent drug offenders have been incarcerated. $121 billion was spent to arrest these offenders and $450 billion to incarcerate them. The legalization would reduce the cost of having to mass incarcerate marginalized communities, which are those who are disproportionately affected. Of those arrested for drug possession or drug related crimes, the majority of those individuals arrested are Black or Hispanic.

=== Demand curve ===
Much of the debate surrounding the economics of drug legalization centers on the shape of the demand curve for illegal drugs and the sensitivity of consumers to changes in the prices of illegal drugs. Proponents of drug legalization often assume that the quantity of addictive drugs consumed is unresponsive to changes in price; however, studies into addictive but legal substances like alcohol and cigarettes have shown that consumption can be quite responsive to changes in prices. In the same study, economists Michael Grossman and Frank J. Chaloupka estimated that a 10% reduction in the price of cocaine would lead to a 14% increase in the frequency of cocaine use. This increase indicates that consumers are responsive to price changes in the cocaine market. There is also evidence that in the long run, consumers are much more responsive to price changes than in the short run, but other studies have led to a wide range of conclusions.

Considering that legalization would likely lead to an increase in the supply of drugs, the standard economic model predicts that the quantity of drugs consumed would rise and the prices would fall. Andrew E. Clark, an economist who has studied the effects of drug legalization, suggests that a specific tax, or sin tax, would counteract the increase in consumption.

== Size of the illegal drug market ==
According to 2013 data from the United Nations Office on Drugs and Crime (UNODC) and European crime-fighting agency Europol, the annual global drugs trade is worth around $435 billion a year, with the annual cocaine trade worth $84 billion of that amount.

== Policies by country ==
=== Asia ===
==== Philippines ====
Senator Bato dela Rosa, despite having the reputation of leading the deadly war on drugs during the presidency of Rodrigo Duterte as chief of the Philippine National Police, filed a bill in the senate in November 2022 proposing the decriminalization of illegal drug use. This bid was an attempt to deal with prison overcrowding and underutilization of drug rehabilitation centers. While the proposal do not include drug trafficking and manufacturing, the bill was met with opposition from law enforcement agencies who believes it would send a "wrong signal" and encourage drug abuse. The Department of Health has supported the proposal.

==== Thailand ====
"A committee tasked with controlling illegal drugs has won a majority vote to have cannabis and hemp reclassified as narcotics, and the listing will take effect on" 1 January 2024, according to media.

Although Thailand has a strict drug policy, in May 2018, the Cabinet approved draft legislation that allows for more research into the effects of marijuana on people. Thus, the Government Pharmaceutical Organization (GPO) will soon begin clinical trials of marijuana as a preliminary step in the production of drugs from this plant. These medical studies are considered new landmarks in the history of Thailand, because the manufacture, storage, and use of marijuana has been completely outlawed in Thailand since 1979.

On 9 November 2018, the National Assembly of Thailand officially proposed to allow licensed medical use of marijuana, thereby legalizing what was previously considered a dangerous drug. The National Assembly on Friday submitted its amendments to the Ministry of Health, which would place marijuana and vegetable kratom in the category allowing their licensed possession and distribution in regulated conditions. The ministry reviewed the amendments before sending them to the cabinet, which returned it to the National Assembly for a final vote. This process was completed on 25 December 2018. Thus, Thailand became the first Asian country to legalize medical cannabis. These changes did not allow recreational use of drugs. These actions were taken because of the growing interest in the use of marijuana and its components for the treatment of certain diseases. Cannabis became decriminalized in Thailand on 9 June 2022, making recreational use also legal, although smoking in public can still incur penalties due to being considered a public nuisance. Supporters of legalization argue that the legal market for marijuana in Thailand could increase to $5 billion by 2024.

=== Europe ===
==== Czech Republic ====
===== Marijuana =====
In the Czech Republic, until 31 December 1998 only drug possession "for other person" (i.e. intent to sell) was criminal (apart from production, importation, exportation, offering or mediation, which was and remains criminal) while possession for personal use remained legal. On 1 January 1999, an amendment of the Criminal Code, which was necessitated in order to align the Czech drug rules with the Single Convention on Narcotic Drugs, became effective, criminalizing possession of "amount larger than small" also for personal use (Art. 187a of the Criminal Code) while possession of small amounts for personal use became a misdemeanor. The judicial practice came to the conclusion that the "amount larger than small" must be five to ten times larger (depending on drug) than a usual single dose of an average consumer.

On 14 December 2009, the Government of the Czech Republic adopted Regulation No. 467/2009 Coll., that took effect on 1 January 2010, and specified what "amount larger than small" under the Criminal Code meant, effectively taking over the amounts that were already established by the previous judicial practice. According to the regulation, a person could possess up to 15 grams of marijuana or 1.5 grams of heroin without facing criminal charges. These amounts were higher (often many times) than in any other European country, possibly making the Czech Republic the most liberal country in the European Union when it comes to drug liberalization, apart from Portugal. Under the Regulation No. 467/2009 Coll, possession of the following amounts or less of illicit drugs was to be considered smaller than large for the purposes of the Criminal Code and was to be treated as a misdemeanor subject to a fine equal to a parking ticket:

- Marijuana 15 grams (or five plants)
- Hashish 5 grams
- Magic mushrooms 40 pieces
- Peyote 5 plants
- LSD 5 tablets
- Ecstasy 4 tablets
- Amphetamine 2 grams
- Methamphetamine 2 grams
- Heroin 1.5 grams
- Coca 5 plants
- Cocaine 1 gram

In 2013, a District Court in Liberec was deciding a case of a person that was accused of criminal possession for having 3.25 grams of methamphetamine (1.9 grams of straight methamphetamine base), well over the Regulation's limit of 2 grams. The court considered that basing a decision on mere Regulation would be unconstitutional and in breach of Article 39 of the Czech Charter of Fundamental Rights and Freedoms which states that "only a law may designate which acts constitute a crime and what penalties, or other detriments to rights or property, may be imposed for committing them" and proposed to the Constitutional Court to abolish the Regulation. In line with the District Courts' argument, the Constitutional Court abolished the Regulation effective from 23 August 2013, noting that the "amount larger than small" within the meaning of the Criminal Code may be designated only by the means of an Act of Parliament, and not a Governmental Regulation. Moreover, the Constitutional Court further noted that the Regulation merely took over already existing judicial practice of interpretation of what constitutes "amount larger than small" and thus its abolishment will not really change the criminality of drug possession in the country. Thus, the above-mentioned amounts from the now-not-effective Regulation remained as the base for consideration of police and prosecutors, while courts are not bound by the precise grammage. "Small" amounts remained subject to administrative fines (on par with a parking violation).

Medical use of cannabis on prescription has been legal and regulated since 1 April 2013.

Beginning 2026, cultivation of 3 plants and possession of 100g (at home) / 25g (in a public setting) of marijuana was legalised. Cultivation of up to 5 plants and possession of up to 200g at home is treated as civil infraction subject to administrative fine (on par with a parking violation), while larger amounts remain criminal. Sale or procurement of marijuana for other person remains criminal notwithstanding the amount (weight).

===== Psilocybin =====
Beginning 2026, psilocybin was authorized for medical use. Doctors will be able to prescribe it for treatment of severe depression, addiction, existential distress in cancer patients or patients with post-traumatic stress disorder.

==== France ====
Following a contentious debate France opened its first supervised injection centre on 11 October 2016. Marisol Touraine, the Minister of Health, declared that the centre, located near the Gare du Nord in Paris, was "a strong political response, for a pragmatic and responsible policy that brings high-risk people back towards the health system rather than stigmatizing them."

==== Germany ====
In 1994, the Federal Constitutional Court ruled that drug addiction was not a crime, nor was the possession of small amounts of drugs for personal use. In 2000, Germany's Narcotic Drugs Act (BtMG) was changed to allow for supervised drug injection rooms. In 2002, a pilot study was started in seven German cities to evaluate the effects of heroin-assisted treatment on addicts, compared to methadone-assisted treatment. The positive results of the study led to the inclusion of heroin-assisted treatment into the services of the mandatory health insurance in 2009. On 4 May 2016, the Cabinet of Germany decided to approve the measure for legal cannabis for seriously ill patients who have consulted with a doctor and "have no therapeutic alternative". German Health Minister, Hermann Gröhe, presented the legal draft on the legalization of medical cannabis to the cabinet which took effect in March 2017. The Cannabis Act took effect in 2024.

==== Ireland ====
On 2 November 2015, Aodhán Ó Ríordáin, the minister in charge of the National Drugs Strategy, announced that Ireland planned to introduce supervised injection rooms. The minister also referenced that possession of controlled substances will be decriminalized although supply and production will remain criminalized. On 12 July 2017, the Health Committee of the Irish government rejected a bill that would have legalized medical cannabis.

==== Netherlands ====
The drug policy of the Netherlands is based on two principles: (1) drug use is a public health issue, not a criminal matter, and (2) a distinction between hard and soft drugs exists. Additionally, a policy of non-enforcement has led to a situation where reliance upon non-enforcement has become common; because of this, the courts have ruled against the government when individual cases were prosecuted. Cannabis remains a controlled substance in the Netherlands and both possession and production for personal use are still misdemeanors, punishable by fine. Cannabis coffee shops are also illegal according to the statutes.

==== Norway ====
On 14 June 2010, the Stoltenberg commission recommended implementing heroin assisted treatment and expanding harm reduction measures. On 18 June 2010, Knut Storberget, Minister of Justice and the Police, announced that the ministry was working on new drug policy involving decriminalization by the Portugal model, which was to be introduced to parliament before the next general election. Storberget later changed his statements, saying the decriminalization debate is "for academics", instead calling for coerced treatment. In early March 2013, minister of health and care services Jonas Gahr Støre proposed to decriminalize the inhalation of heroin by 2014 as a measure to decrease drug overdoses. In 2011, there were 294 fatal overdoses, in comparison to only 170 traffic related deaths.

The country was preparing a massive policy change in terms of how to deal with drug use and drug possession for personal use. The reform titled "From punishment to help" was approved by the Norwegian government in 2017 and was in the final phase of approval by the parliament. Changes were expected to be implemented by early 2021. The new reform policy emphasizes that criminalizing drug use has no significant effect on rates of drug consumption and that drug addiction is better dealt with by health care services, hence the slogan "from punishment to help". Instead of fines or prison time, a person caught with a drug quantity for personal use will now be met with an independent panel consisting of social and health care workers that will discuss administrative sanctions or addiction treatment methods. This will hopefully encourage problematic users to seek help rather than fear of prosecution. There is also hope that this will improve the relationship between drug users and law enforcement officers. Opponents of the reform, including the police force and the Progress Party, fear that drug use will increase once a person is no longer at risk of facing criminal charges.

As of 21 July 2022, drug decriminalisation has not materialised in Norway. As of this date, only those who have substance use disorders may go unpunished if the amount of illegal drugs they have meets the criteria of what is deemed an amount for personal use.

==== Portugal ====
In 2001, Portugal became the first European country to abolish all criminal penalties for personal drug possession, under Law 30/2000. Drug users were to be provided with therapy rather than prison sentences. Research commissioned by the Cato Institute and led by Glenn Greenwald found that in the five years after the start of decriminalization, illegal drug use by teenagers had declined, the rate of HIV infections among drug users had dropped, deaths related to heroin and similar drugs had been cut by more than half, and the number of people seeking treatment for drug addiction had doubled. Peter Reuter, a professor of criminology and public policy at the University of Maryland, College Park, suggested that the heroin usage rates and related deaths may have been due to the cyclical nature of drug epidemics. In 2009, he stated that "decriminalization in Portugal has met its central goal. Drug use did not rise." As opposed to neighbouring countries that did not introduce equivalent reforms Portugal exhibited a decline in hazardous drug use and had the lowest drug-related death rates in Europe as of 2022.

A subsequent reduction in funding lead to an increase in visible drug use in Portuguese cities by 2023.

==== Ukraine ====
The use of marijuana in Ukraine is not prohibited, but the manufacture, storage, transportation and sale of cannabis and its derivatives are under administrative and criminal liability. Speaking on the legalization of soft drugs in Ukraine has been going on for a long time. In June 2016, the Parliament received a bill on the legalization of marijuana for medical purposes. It dealt with changes to the current act "On narcotic drugs, psychotropic substances and precursors" and was registered number 4533. The document must examine the relevant committee, and then submit it to the government. It was expected that this would happen in the fall of 2016, but the bill was not considered. In October 2018, a petition appeared on the website of electronic appeals to the President of Ukraine asking for the legalization of marijuana. In October 2018, the State Service of Ukraine on Drugs and Drug Control issued the first license for the import and re-export of raw materials and products derived from cannabis. The corresponding licenses were obtained by the USA company C21. The company is also in the process of applying for additional licenses, including the cultivation of cannabis.

=== Latin America ===
In the late 2000s and early 2010s, advocacy for drug legalization has increased in Latin America. Spearheading the movement Uruguayan government announced in 2012 plans to legalize state-controlled sales of marijuana in order to fight drug-related crimes. Some countries in this region have already advanced towards depenalization of personal consumption.

==== Argentina ====
In August 2009, the Supreme Court of Argentina declared in a landmark ruling that it was unconstitutional to prosecute citizens for having drugs for their personal use – "adults should be free to make lifestyle decisions without the intervention of the state". The decision affected the second paragraph of Article 14 of the country's drug control legislation (Law Number 23,737) that punishes the possession of drugs for personal consumption with prison sentences ranging from one month to two years (although education or treatment measures can be substitute penalties). The unconstitutionality of the article concerns cases of drug possession for personal consumption that does not affect others.

==== Brazil ====
In 2002 and 2006, Brazil went through legislative changes, resulting in a partial decriminalization of possession for personal use. Prison sentences no longer applied and were replaced by educational measures and community services; however, the 2006 law does not provide objective means to distinguish between users or traffickers. A disparity exists between the decriminalization of drug use and the increased penalization of selling drugs, punishable with a maximum prison sentences of 5 years for the sale of very minor quantities of drugs. Most of those incarcerated for drug trafficking are offenders caught selling small quantities of drugs, among them drug users who sell drugs to finance their drug habits. Since 2006, there has been a long debate whether the anti-drug law goes against the Constitution and principle of personal freedom. In 2009, the Supreme Federal Court re-opened to vote if the law is Constitutional, or if it goes against the Constitution specifically against personal Freedom of choice. Since each Minister inside the tribunal can take a personal time to evaluate the law, the voting can take years. In fact, the voting was re-opened in 2015, 3 ministers voted in favor, and then the law was again paused by another minister.

==== Colombia ====
Guatemalan President Otto Pérez Molina and Colombian President Juan Manuel Santos proposed the legalization of drugs in an effort to counter the failure of the war on drugs, which was said to have yielded poor results at a huge cost. On 25 May 2016, the Colombian congress approved the legalization of marijuana for medical usage.

==== Costa Rica ====
Costa Rica has decriminalized drugs for personal consumption. Manufacturing or selling drugs is still a jailable offense.

==== Ecuador ====
According to the 2008 Constitution of Ecuador, in its Article 364, the Ecuadorian state does not see drug consumption as a crime but only as a health concern. In June 2013, the state drugs regulatory office CONSEP published a table which established maximum quantities carried by persons so as to be considered in legal possession and that person as not a seller of drugs.

In November 2023, the consumption table was abolished, consequently, there is no longer a legal amount for drug possession.

==== Honduras ====
On 22 February 2008, Honduras President Manuel Zelaya called on the United States to legalize drugs in order to prevent the majority of violent murders occurring in Honduras. Honduras is used by cocaine smugglers as a transiting point between Colombia and the US. Honduras, with a population of 7 million affected people an average of 8–10 murders a day, with an estimated 70% being as a result of this international drug trade. According to Zelaya, the same problem is occurring in Guatemala, El Salvador, Costa Rica, and Mexico.

==== Mexico ====
In April 2009, the Mexican Congress approved changes in the General Health Law that decriminalized the possession of illegal drugs for immediate consumption and personal use allowing a person to possess up to 5 g of marijuana or 500 mg of cocaine. The only restriction is that people in possession of drugs should not be within a 300-meter radius of schools, police departments, or correctional facilities. Opium, heroin, LSD, and other synthetic drugs were also decriminalized, it will not be considered as a crime as long as the dose does not exceed the limit established in the General Health Law. Many question this, as cocaine is as much synthesised as heroin, both are produced as extracts from plants. The law establishes very low amount thresholds and strictly defines personal dosage. For those arrested with more than the threshold allowed by the law this can result in heavy prison sentences, as they will be assumed to be small traffickers even if there are no other indications that the amount was meant for selling.

==== Uruguay ====
Uruguay is one of few countries that never criminalized the possession of drugs for personal use. Since 1974, the law establishes no quantity limits, leaving it to the judge's discretion to determine whether the intent was personal use. Once it is determined by the judge that the amount in possession was meant for personal use, there are no sanctions. In June 2012, the Uruguayan government announced plans to legalize state-controlled sales of marijuana in order to fight drug-related crimes. The government also stated that they will ask global leaders to do the same.

On 31 July 2013, the Uruguayan House of Representatives approved a bill to legalize the production, distribution, sale, and consumption of marijuana by a vote of 50 to 46. The bill then passed the Senate, where the left-leaning majority coalition, the Broad Front, held a comfortable majority. The bill was approved by the Senate by 16 to 13 on 10-December-2013. The bill was presented to the President José Mujica, also of the Broad Front coalition, who has supported legalization since June 2012. Relating this vote to the 2012 legalization of marijuana by the U.S. states Colorado and Washington, John Walsh, drug policy expert of the Washington Office on Latin America, stated that "Uruguay's timing is right. Because of last year's Colorado and Washington State votes to legalize, the U.S. government is in no position to browbeat Uruguay or others who may follow."

In July 2014, government officials announced that part of the implementation of the law (the sale of cannabis through pharmacies) is postponed to 2015, as "there are practical difficulties". Authorities will grow all the cannabis that can be sold legal. Concentration of THC shall be 15% or lower. In August 2014, an opposition presidential candidate, who was not elected in the November 2014 presidential elections, claimed that the new law was never going to be applied, as it was not workable. By the end of 2016 the government announced that the sale through pharmacies will be fully implemented during 2017.

=== North America ===
==== Canada ====
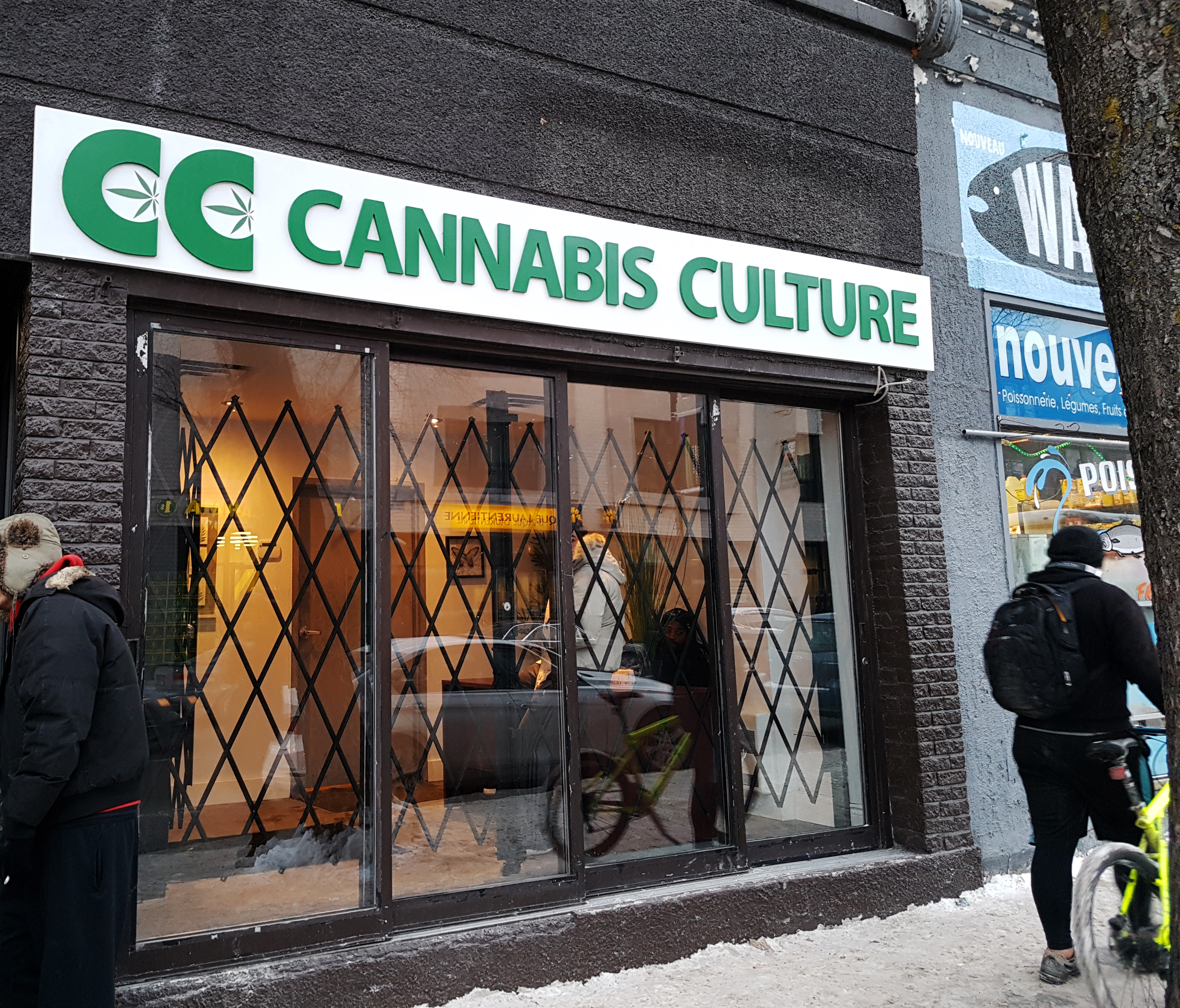
A cannabis shop in Montreal

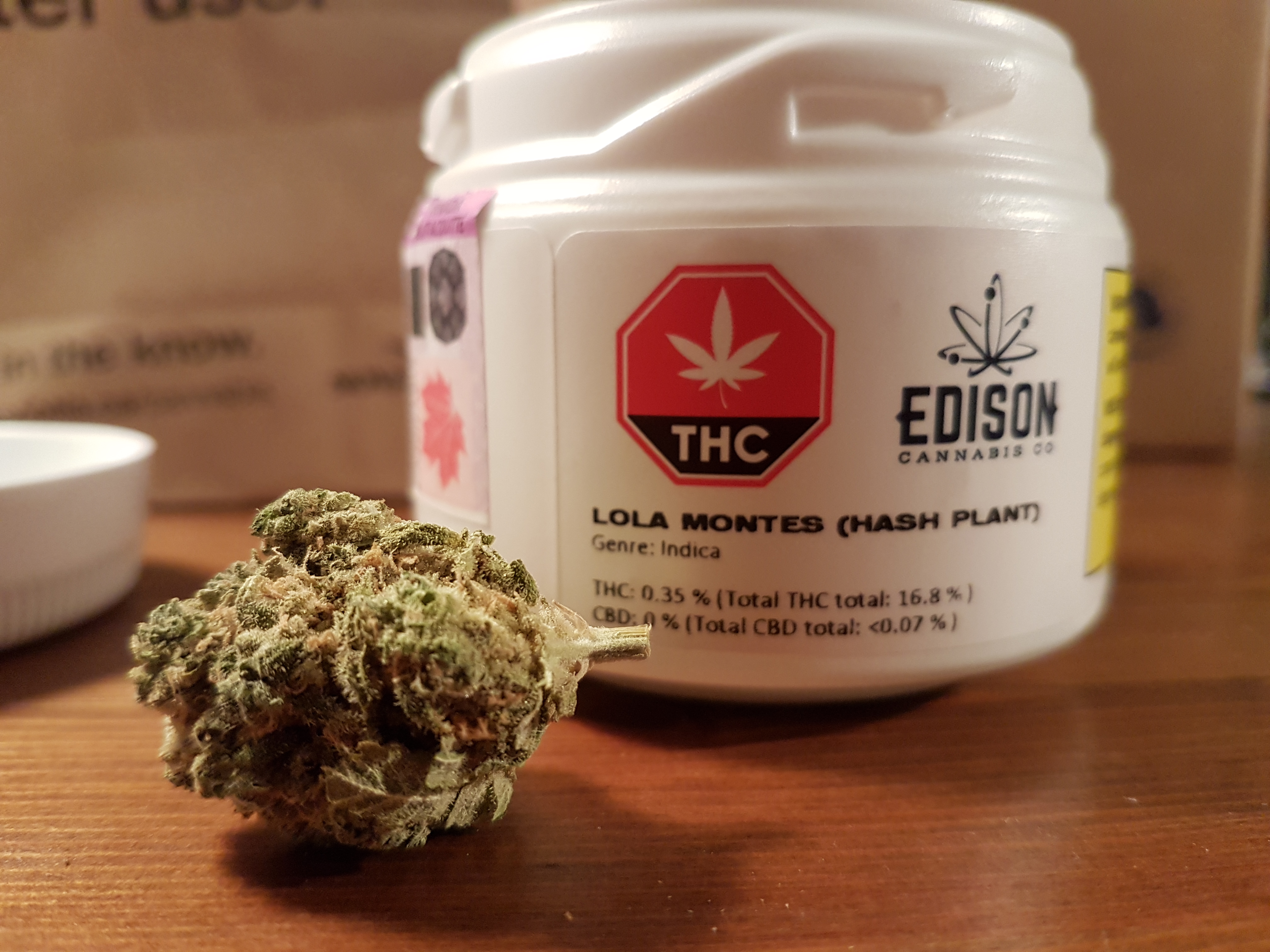
A legal recreational purchase of cannabis in Canada in October 2018

The cultivation of cannabis is currently legal in Canada, except in Manitoba and Quebec. Citizens outside those provinces may grow up to four plants per residence for personal use, and recreational use of cannabis by the general public is legal with restrictions on smoking in public locations that vary by jurisdiction. The sale of marijuana seeds is also legal.

In 2001, The Globe and Mail reported that a poll found 47% of Canadians agreed with the statement, "The use of marijuana should be legalized" in 2000, compared to 26% in 1975. A more recent poll found that more than half of Canadians supported legalization. In 2007, Prime Minister Stephen Harper's government tabled Bill C-26 to amend the Controlled Drugs and Substances Act, 1996 to bring forth a more restrictive law with higher minimum penalties for drug crimes. Bill-26 died in committee after the dissolution of the 39th Canadian Parliament in September 2008, but the Bill was subsequently resurrected by the government twice.

In 2015, Prime Minister Justin Trudeau and the Liberal Party of Canada campaigned on a promise to legalize marijuana. The Cannabis Act was passed on 19 June 2018, which made marijuana legal across Canada on 17 October 2018. Since legalization, the country has set up an online framework to allow consumers to purchase a wide variety of merchandise ranging from herbs, extract, oil capsules, and paraphernalia. Most provinces also provide a venue for purchase through physical brick and mortar stores.

In 2021, the city councils of Vancouver and Toronto voted to decriminalize the simple possession of all drugs; and submitted proposals requesting special exemption from the federal Health Minister to do so, citing numerous scientific, psychological, medical, and socio-economic benefits. In early 2022, the Province of British Columbia submitted its own request for exemption, closely following the Vancouver model. By April of that year, the Edmonton City Council had also passed a motion to request exemption from federal drug enforcement laws in order decriminalize "simple personal possession" of illegal drugs, voting in favour 11–2. On 31 May 2022, the federal government of Canada approved British Columbia's proposal for a three-year pilot to decriminalize all "hard drugs", such as heroin, fentanyl, cocaine, and methamphetamine. From 1 January 2023 until 31 January 2026, British Columbians aged 18 years or older were allowed to carry up to a cumulative total of 2.5 grams of these substances without the risk of arrest or criminal charges. Police were directed not to confiscate the drugs, and there was no requirement that people found to be in possession seek treatment; however, the production, trafficking, and exportation of these drugs remained illegal. The decriminalization pilot ended on 31 January 2026 after the government of British Columbia announced that the pilot would not be extended as decriminalization "hasn’t delivered the results that we hoped for."

==== United States ====
As of 2024, prior to November elections, 47 states, Washington, D.C., and certain U.S. territories allow medical use of cannabis. Of those 38 states, 24 also allow recreational use, as does Washington, D.C. In 2024 November elections, voters in North and South Dakota and Florida failed to legalize the recreational use of marijuana, while Nebraskan voters passed both proposed bills to legalize medicinal cannabis. Legalization in states created significant legal and policy tensions between federal and state governments and sometimes between states. State laws in conflict with federal law about cannabis remain valid, and prevent state level prosecution, despite cannabis being illegal under federal law, as determined in Gonzales v. Raich (2005).

Throughout the United States, various people and groups have been pushing for the legalization of marijuana for medical reasons. Organizations such as NORML and the Marijuana Policy Project work to decriminalize and legalize possession, use, cultivation, and sale of marijuana by adults. In 1996, 56% of California voters voted for California Proposition 215, legalizing the growing and use of marijuana for medical purposes and making California both the first state to outlaw marijuana, in 1913, and the first state to legalize medical marijuana.

On 6 November 2012, the states of Washington and Colorado legalized possession of small amounts of marijuana for private recreational use and created a process for writing rules for legal growing and commercial distribution of marijuana within each state, after having legalized medical cannabis in 1998 and 2000, respectively. In 2014, voters in Oregon, Alaska, and Washington, D.C. voted to legalize marijuana for recreational use, as did California in 2016, with the passage of California Proposition 64, and Michigan in 2018. In 2019, Illinois passed the Illinois Cannabis Regulation and Tax Act, making Illinois the first state to legalize recreational use by an act of the state legislature, which took effect 1 January 2020. In 2020, Oregon decriminalized the possession of all drugs in Measure 110, but in 2024, the Oregon State Senate passed a bill to reverse the decriminalization of hard drugs such as heroin after there was public backlash to the impacts of the measure. In 2021, New York legalized adult-use cannabis when it passed the Marijuana Regulation and Taxation Act (MRTA).

In the United States, psilocybin is classified as a Schedule I substance under the Controlled Substances Act, which prohibits its use, sale, and possession under federal law. Despite this, campaigns to decriminalize and legalize the medical use of psilocybin have succeeded in several jurisdictions since 2019.

Denver became the first city to decriminalize psilocybin in May 2019, followed by Oakland in June 2019, Santa Cruz, California in January 2020, and Washington, D.C. in November 2020. Oregon voters passed two ballot measures in 2020, making it the first state to legalize the supervised use of psilocybin and decriminalize possession of all drugs, including psilocybin. Colorado followed with a similar medical use and decriminalization measure in 2022. Since then, reforms have been enacted in more jurisdictions across the U.S.

=== Oceania ===
==== Australia ====
In 2016, Australia legalised medicinal cannabis on a federal level. Since 1985, the Federal Government has run a declared war on drugs and while initially Australia led the world in 'harm-minimization' approach, they have since lagged. Australia has a number of political parties that focus on cannabis reform, The (HEMP) Help End Marijuana Prohibition Party was founded in 1993 and registered by the Australian Electoral Commission in 2000. The Legalise Cannabis Queensland Party was established in 2020. A number of Australian and international groups have promoted reform in regard to 21st-century Australian drug policy. Organisations such as Australian Parliamentary Group on Drug Law Reform, Responsible Choice, the Australian Drug Law Reform Foundation, Norml Australia, Law Enforcement Against Prohibition (LEAP) Australia and Drug Law Reform Australia advocate for drug law reform without the benefit of government funding. The membership of some of these organisations is diverse and consists of the general public, social workers, lawyers and doctors, and the Global Commission on Drug Policy has been a formative influence on a number of these organisations. In 1994, the Australian National Task Force on Cannabis formed under the Ministerial Council on Drug Strategy noted that the social harm of cannabis prohibition is greater than the harm from cannabis itself, total prohibition policies have been unsuccessful in reducing drug use and have caused significant social harm, as well as higher law enforcement costs, the use of cannabis is widespread in Australia and that its adverse health effects are modest and only affect a minority of users.

In 2012, the think tank Australia 21, released a report on the decriminalization of drugs in Australia. It noted that "by defining the personal use and possession of certain psychoactive drugs as criminal acts, governments have also avoided any responsibility to regulate and control the quality of substances that are in widespread use." "Prohibition has fostered the development of a criminal industry that is corrupting civil society and government and killing our children." The report also highlighted the fact that, just as alcohol and tobacco are regulated for quality assurance, distribution, marketing and taxation, so should currently, unregulated, illicit drugs. There has been a number of enquires in Australia relating to cannabis and other illicit drugs, in 2019 the Queensland government instructed the Queensland Productivity Commission to conduct an enquiry into imprisonment and recidivism in QLD; the final report was sent to the Queensland Government on 1 August 2019 and publicly released on 31 January 2020. The commission found that "all available evidence shows the war on drugs fails to restrict usage or supply" and that "decriminalisation would improve the lives of drug users without increasing the rate of drug use" with the commission ultimately recommending that the Queensland government legalise cannabis. The QPC said the system had also fuelled an illegal market, particularly for methamphetamine. Although the Palaszczuk Queensland Labor Party led state government rejected the recommendations of its own commission and said it had no plans to alter any laws around cannabis, a decision that received heavy scrutiny from supporters of decriminalization, legalisation, progressive and non progressive drug policy advocates alike.

In 2019, The Royal Australasian College of Physicians (RACP) and St. Vincent's Health Australia called on the NSW Government to publicly release the findings of the Special Commission of Inquiry into the Drug 'Ice, saying there was "no excuse" for the delay. The report was the culmination of months of evidence from health and judicial experts, as well as families and communities affected by amphetamine-type substances across NSW. The report made 109 recommendations aimed to strengthen the NSW Governments response regarding amphetamine-based drugs such as crystal meth or ice. Major recommendations included more supervised drug use rooms, a prison needle and syringe exchange program, state-wide clinically supervised substance testing, including mobile pill testing at festivals, decriminalisation of drugs for personal use, a cease to the use of drug detection dogs at music festivals and to limit the use of strip searches. The report, also called for the NSW Government to adopt a comprehensive Drug and Alcohol policy, with the last drug and Alcohol policy expiring over a decade ago. The reports commissioner said the state's approach to drug use was profoundly flawed and said reform would require "political leadership and courage" and "Criminalising use and possession encourages us to stigmatise people who use drugs as the authors of their own misfortunate". Mr Howard said current laws "allow us tacit permission to turn a blind eye to the factors driving most problematic drug use" including childhood abuse, domestic violence and mental illness. The NSW government rejected the reports key recommendations, saying it would consider the other remaining recommendations. Director of the Drug Policy Modelling Program (DPMP) at UNSW Sydney's Social Policy Research Centre said the NSW Government has missed an opportunity to reform the state's response to drugs based on evidence. The NSW Government is yet to officially respond to the inquiry as of November 2020, a statement was released from the government citing intention to respond by the end of 2020.

In the Australian Capital Territory, after a bill was passed on 25 September 2019, new laws came into effect on 31 January 2020. While personal possession and growth of small amounts of cannabis remains prohibited non-medicinal purposes in every other jurisdiction in Australia, it allowed for possession of up to 50 grams of dry material, 150 grams of wet material, and cultivation of 2 plants per individual up to 4 plants per household, effectively legalising the possession and growing of cannabis in the ACT; however the sale and supply of cannabis and cannabis seeds is still illegal, so the effects of the laws are limited and the laws also contradict federal laws. It is also still illegal to smoke or use cannabis in a public place, expose a child or young person to cannabis smoke, store cannabis where children can reach it, grow cannabis using hydroponics or artificial cultivation, grow plants where they can be accessed by the public, share or give cannabis as a gift to another person, to drive with any cannabis in your system, or for people aged under 18 to grow, possess, or use cannabis.

In October 2023, the Australian Capital Territory became the first territory in the country to decriminalize the possession of hard drugs. The law was passed in 2022 by the Legislative Assembly. Under the law, people found with small amounts of illicit drugs would be cautioned, fined or referred to a drug diversion program.

==== New Zealand ====
On 18 December 2018, the Labour-led government announced a nationwide, binding referendum on the legality of cannabis for personal use, set to be held as part of the 2020 general election. This was a condition of the Green Party giving confidence and supply to the Government. On 7 May 2019, the government announced that the 2020 New Zealand cannabis referendum would be a yes/no question to enact a yet-to-be created piece of legislation. Despite the earlier commitment, the referendum was non-binding, the proposed Cannabis Legalisation and Control Bill would have need to be introduced into Parliament and passed like any other piece of legislation; therefore, the government was not in fact bound to the results of the referendum. Official results for the general election and referendums were released on 6 November 2020. The number opposed to legalisation was 50.7% with 48.4% in favour and 0.9% of votes were declared Informal.

== Groups advocating change ==
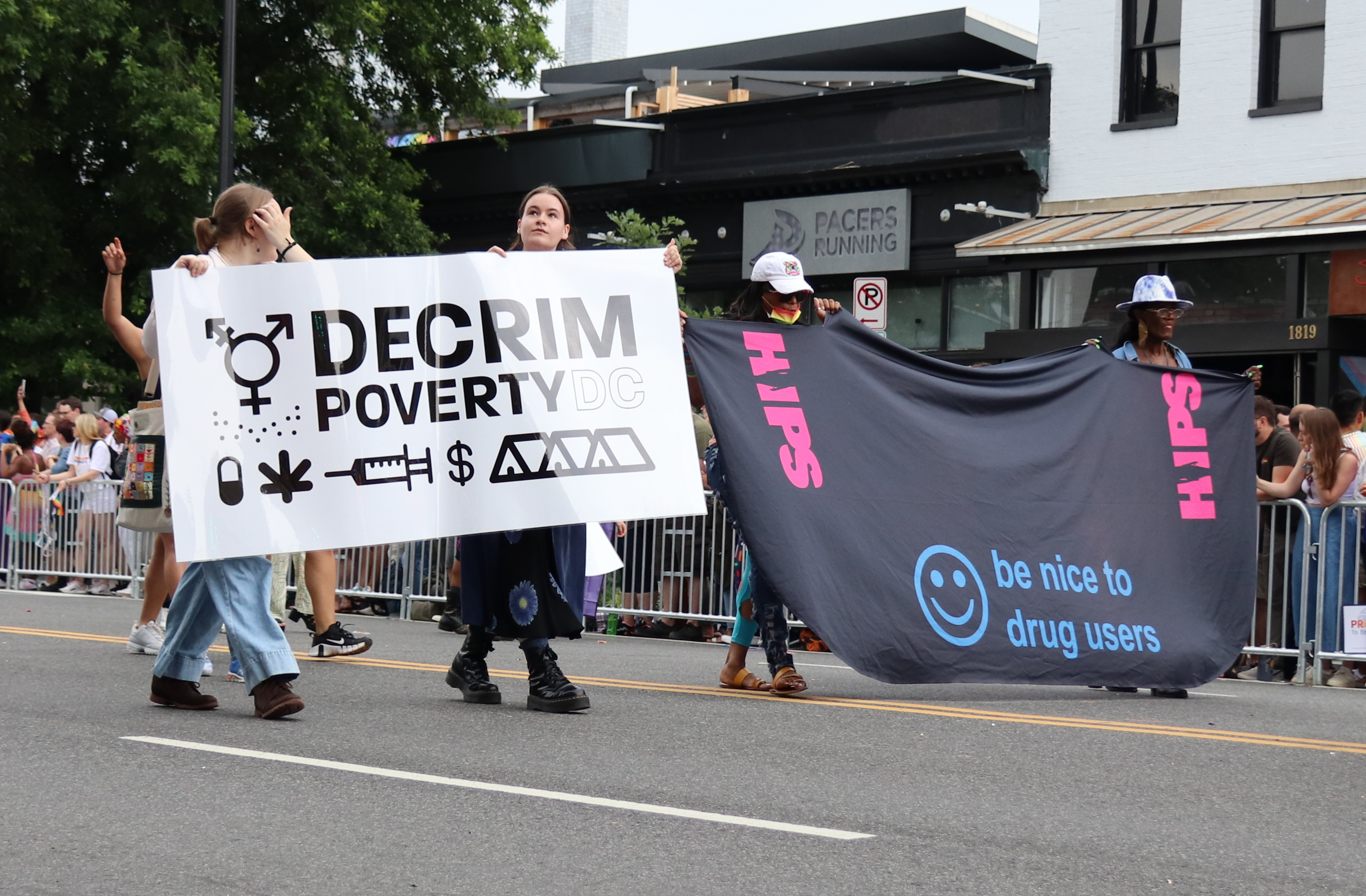
DecrimPovertyDC at the 47th Capital Pride Parade, Washington D.C., 2022

The Senlis Council, a European development and policy think tank, has, since its conception in 2002, advocated that drug addiction should be viewed as a public health issue rather than a purely criminal matter. The group does not support the decriminalisation of illegal drugs. Since 2003, the council has called for the licensing of poppy cultivation in Afghanistan in order to manufacture poppy-based medicines, such as morphine and codeine, and to combat poverty in rural communities, breaking ties with the illicit drugs trade. The Senlis Council outlined proposals for the implementation of a village based poppy for medicine project and calls for a pilot project for Afghan morphine at the next planting season.

== Organizations involved in lobbying, research and advocacy ==
=== Canada ===
- Le Dain Commission of Inquiry into the Non-Medical Use of Drugs

=== Europe ===
- Beckley Foundation
- Cannabis Law Reform
- Drug Equality Alliance (DEA)
- European Coalition for Just and Effective Drug Policies (ENCOD) (Branches in Austria, Germany and Norway)
- Legalize.net (Netherlands)
- Schildower Kreis (Goethe University Frankfurt, Germany)
- NORML UK
- Re:Vision Drug Policy Network (United Kingdom)
- Regulación Responsible (Spain)
- Release (agency) (United Kingdom)
- Students for Sensible Drug Policy UK (United Kingdom)
- Transform Drug Policy Foundation

=== Australia ===
- Australian National Council on Drugs
- Drug Policy Australia
- Network Against Prohibition

=== New Zealand ===
- The Helen Clark Foundation
- NORML New Zealand
- The STAR Trust

=== United States ===
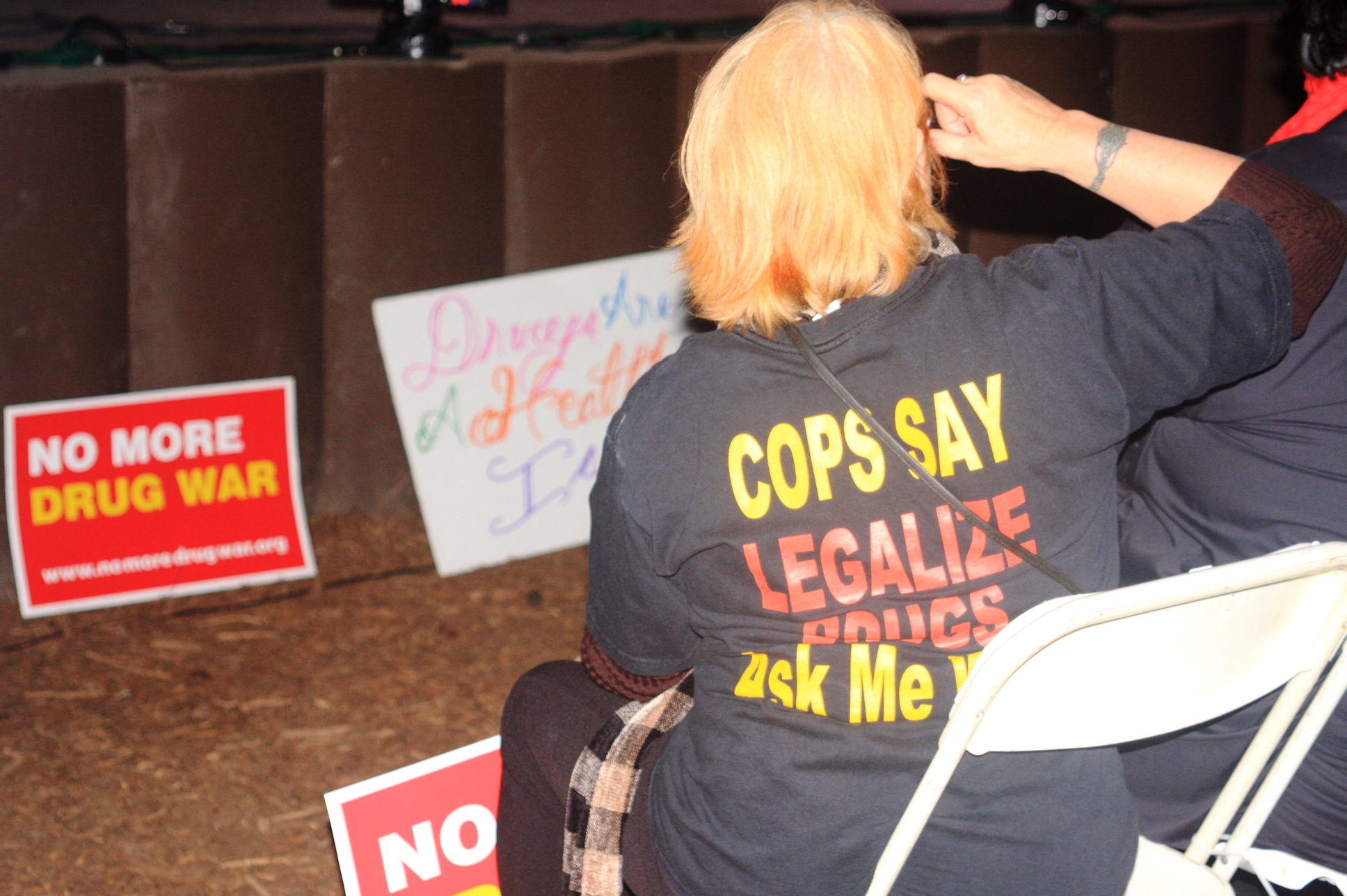
Rally and concert to end the war on drugs - MacArthur Park, Los Angeles. 3 November 2011. Nikki David / Neon Tommy.

- American Civil Liberties Union
- Americans for Safe Access
- Drug Policy Alliance
- High Times
- High Times Freedom Fighters
- Law Enforcement Against Prohibition
- Lindesmith Center
- Marijuana Policy Project
- MASS CANN/NORML
- Multidisciplinary Association for Psychedelic Studies (MAPS)
- National Organization for the Reform of Marijuana Laws
- Students for Sensible Drug Policy
- Veterans for Medical Marijuana Access
- November Coalition (United States)
- Women Grow

== Political parties with drug liberalization policies ==
Many political parties support, to various degrees, and for various reasons, liberalizing drug control laws, from liberal parties to far-left movements, as well as some right-wing intellectuals. Drug liberalization is fundamental in the platforms of most Libertarian parties. There are also numerous single issue marijuana parties devoted to campaign for the legalization of cannabis exclusively.

=== Australia ===
- Australian Greens
- Drug Law Reform Australia
- Fusion Party
- Legalise Cannabis Australia
- Legalise Cannabis Queensland
- Legalise Cannabis Western Australia Party
- Reason Party

=== Canada ===
- Liberal Party of Canada
- New Democratic Party of Canada
- Libertarian Party of Canada
- Marijuana Party

=== Hungary ===
- MKKP

=== Netherlands ===
- GroenLinks
- D66

=== Germany ===
- Die Linke

=== New Zealand ===
- Green Party of Aotearoa New Zealand

=== Portugal ===
- Left Bloc
- Liberal Initiative
- LIVRE

=== United Kingdom ===
- Green Party of England and Wales
- Liberal Democrats – in March 2016, the Liberal Democrats became the first major political party in the United Kingdom to support the legalisation of cannabis.

=== International ===
- Pirate Party

== Gallery ==
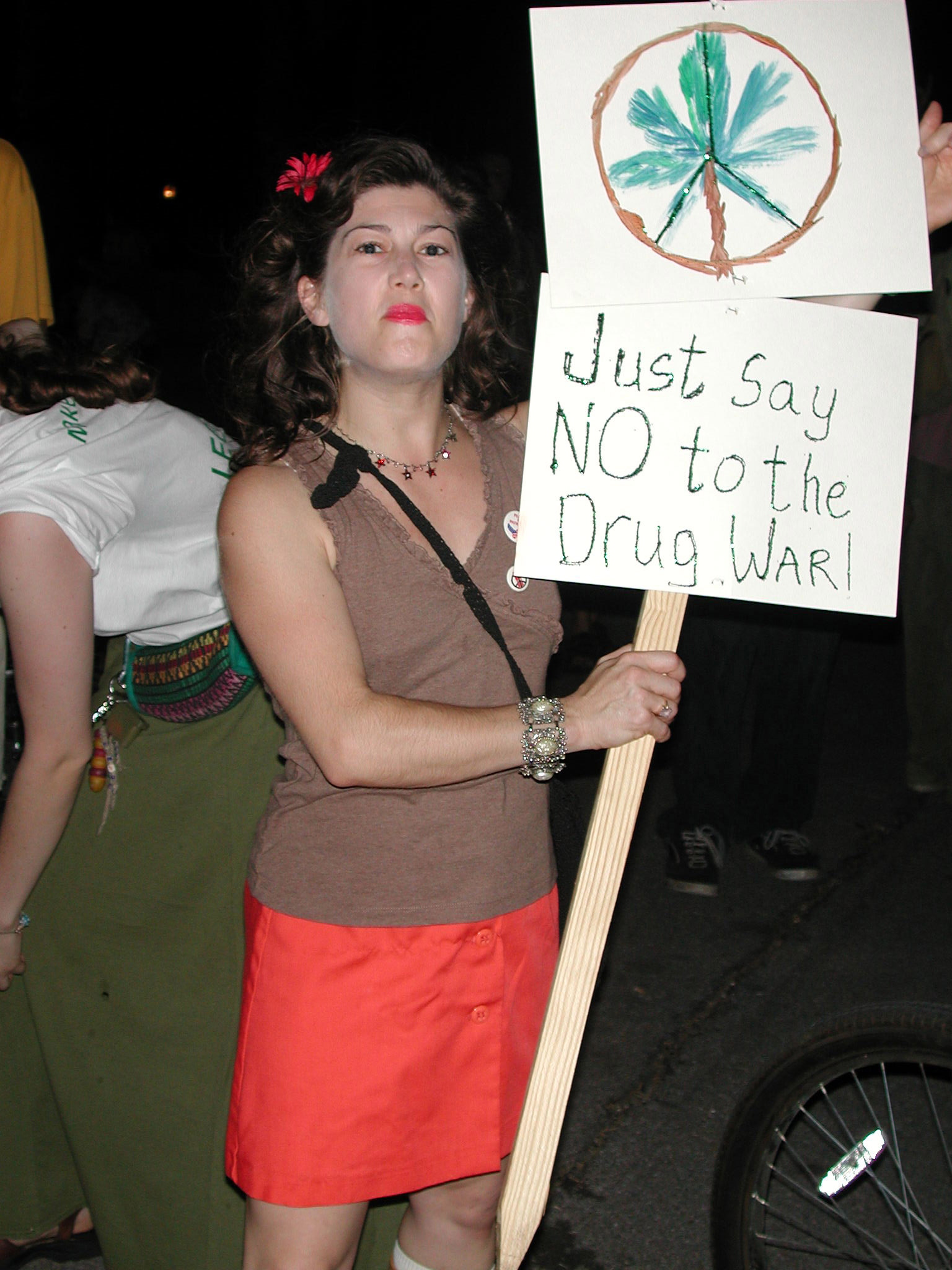

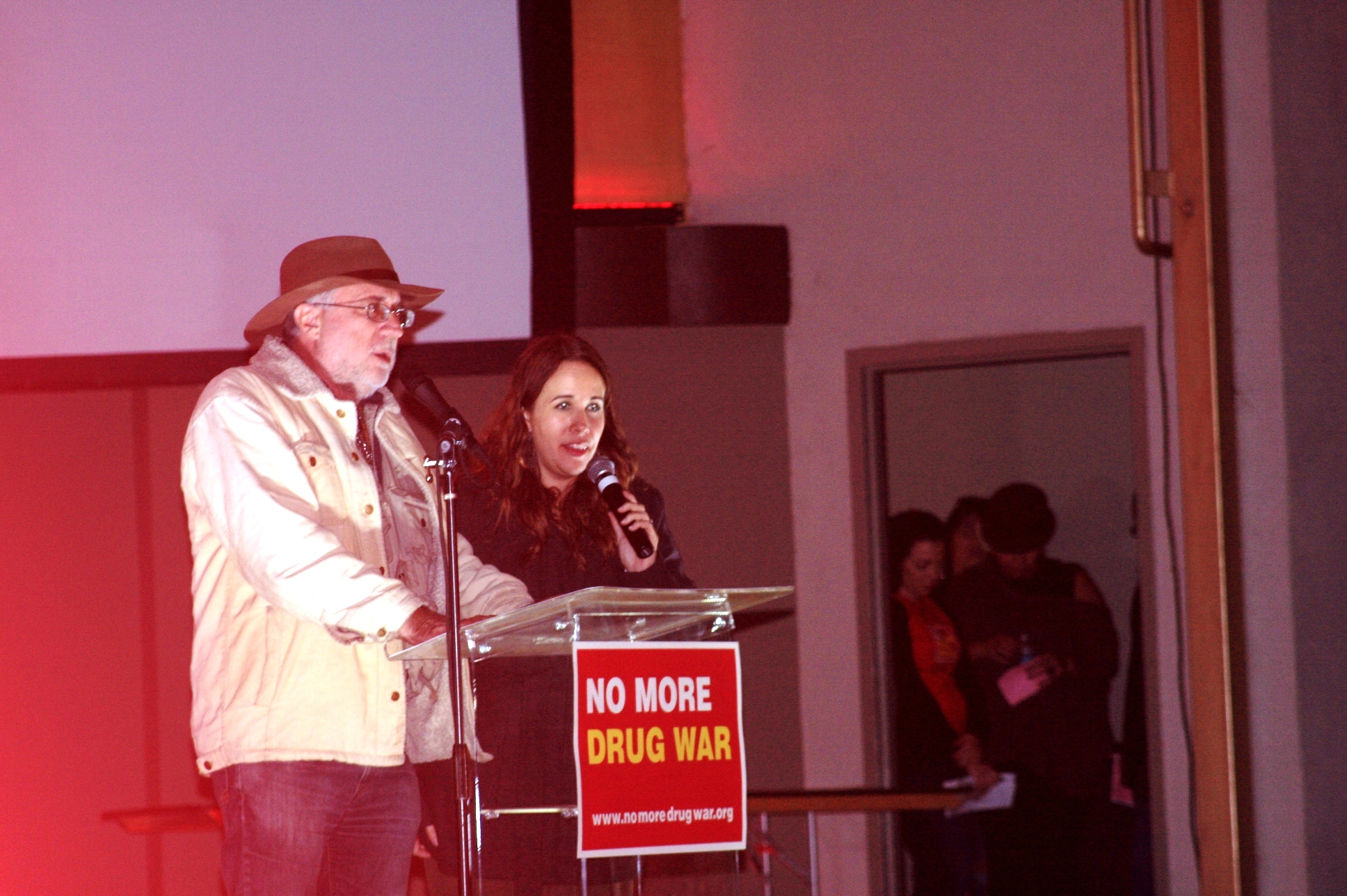

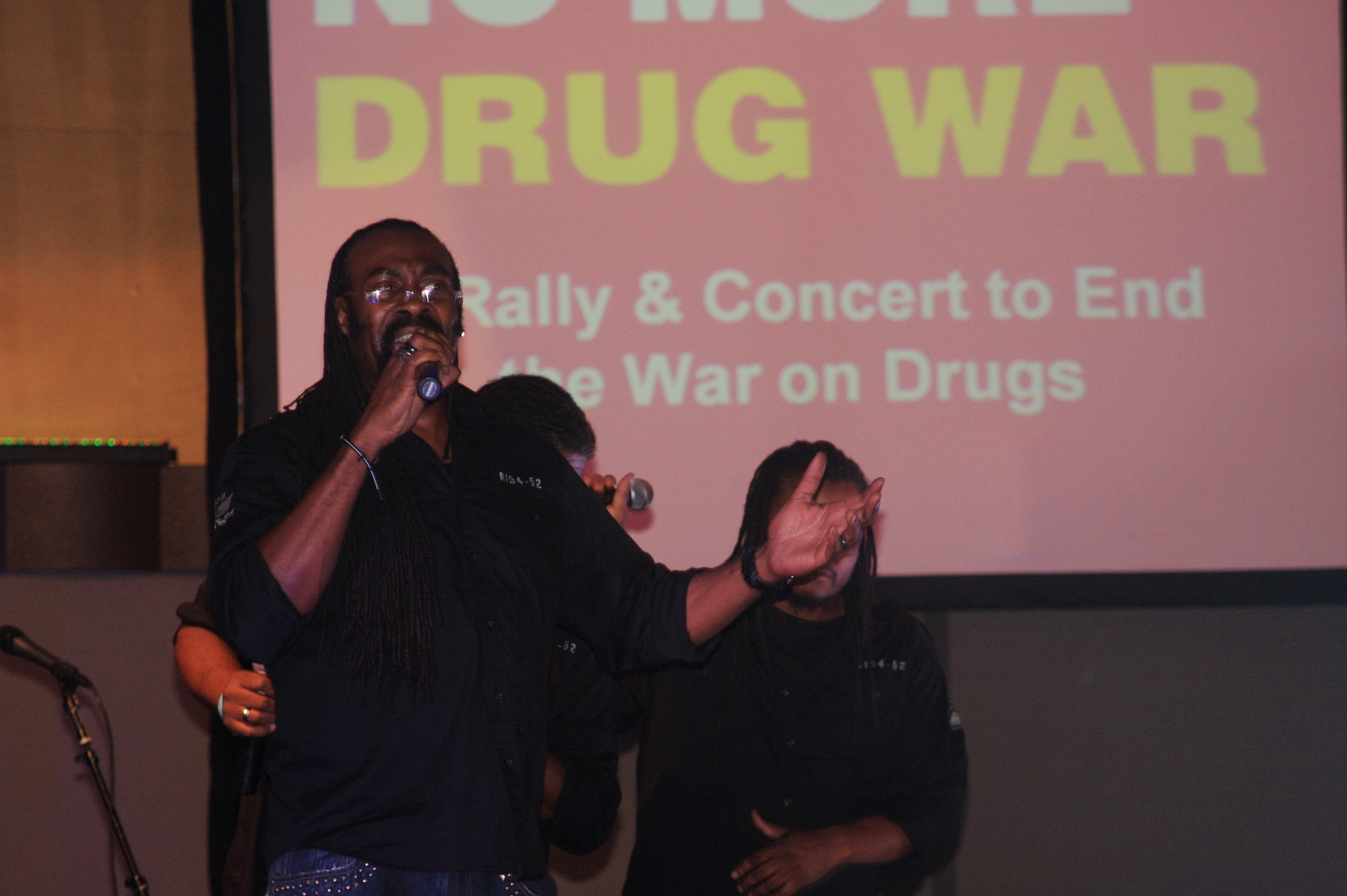

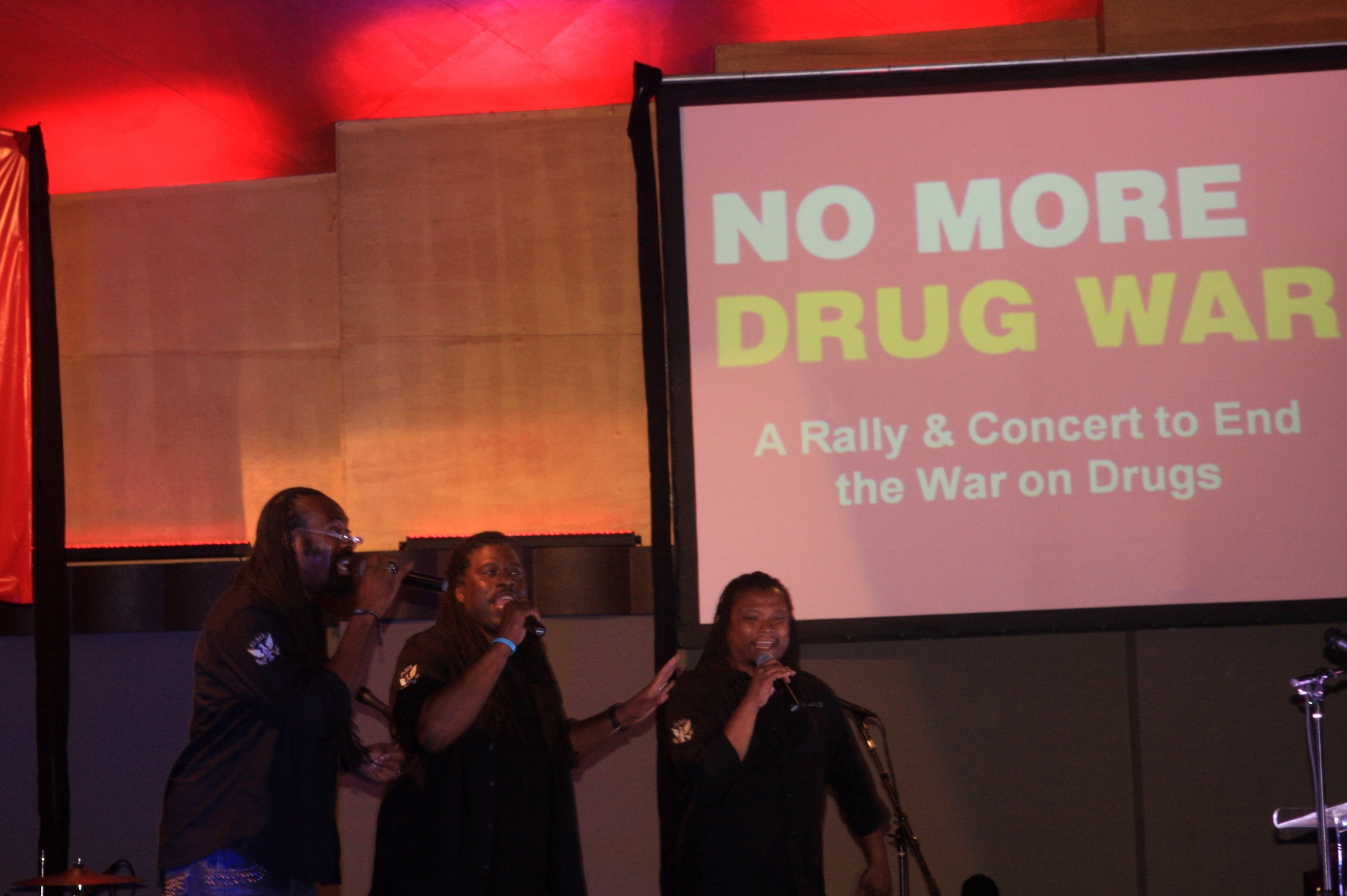

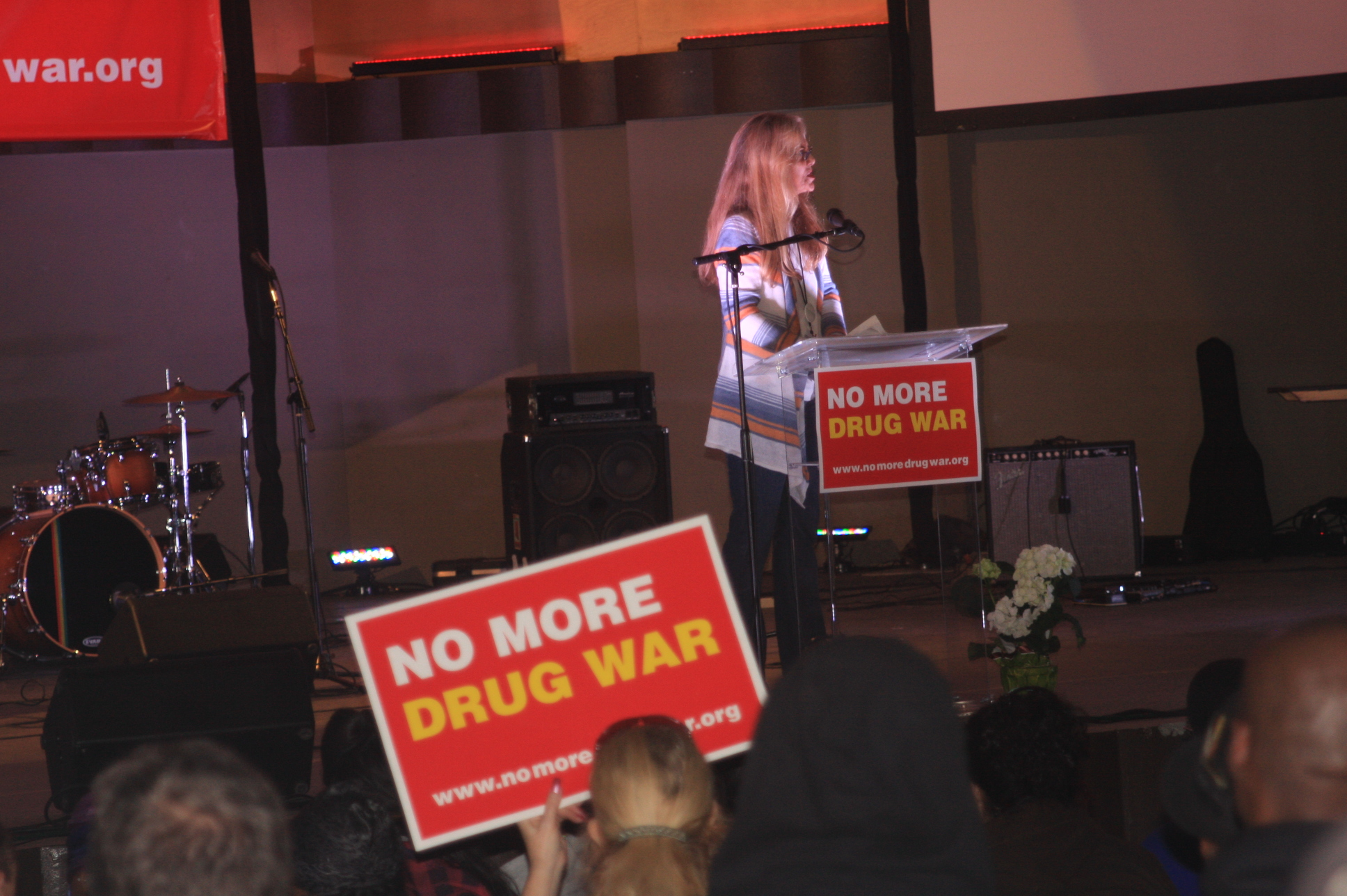

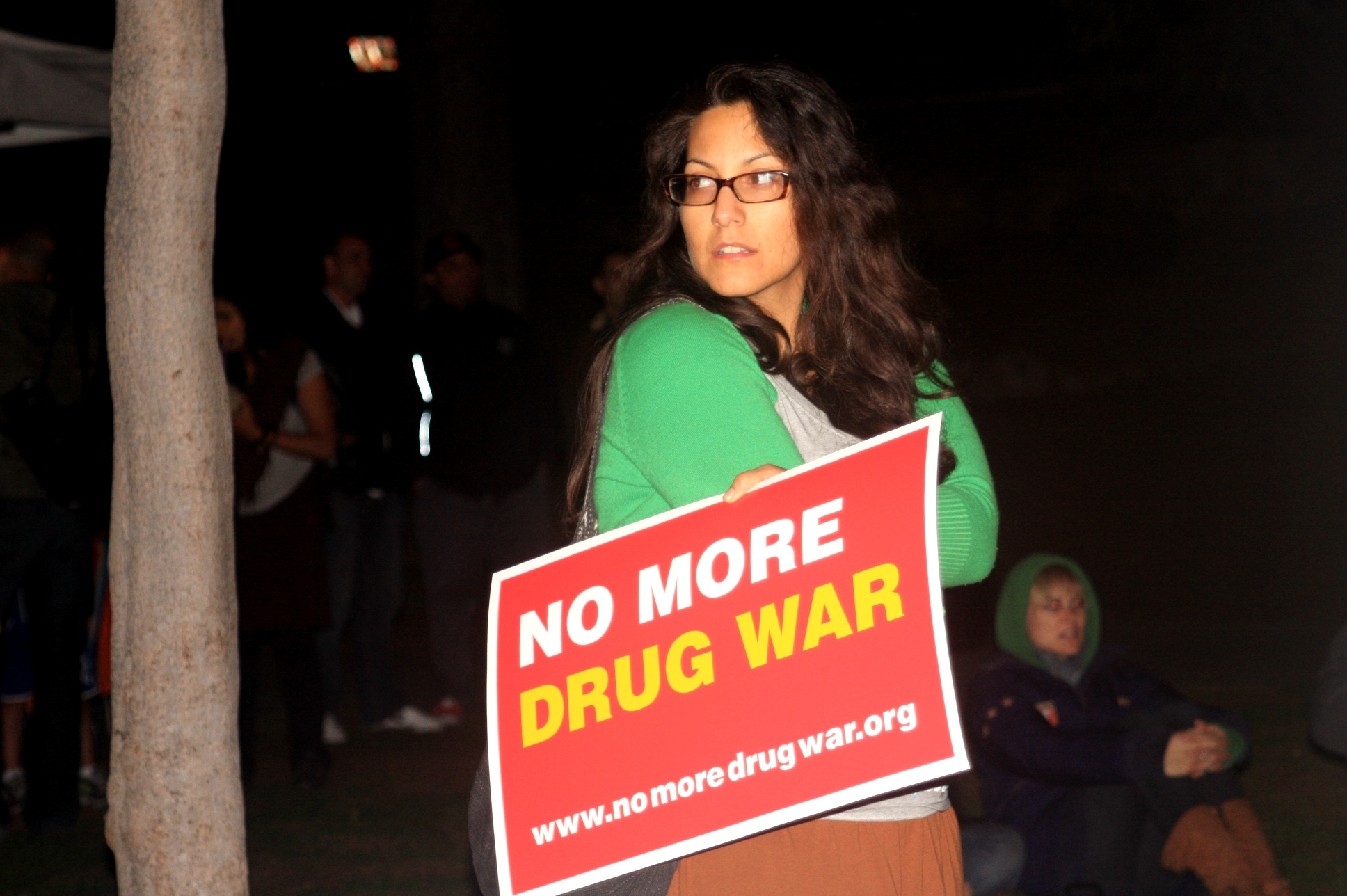

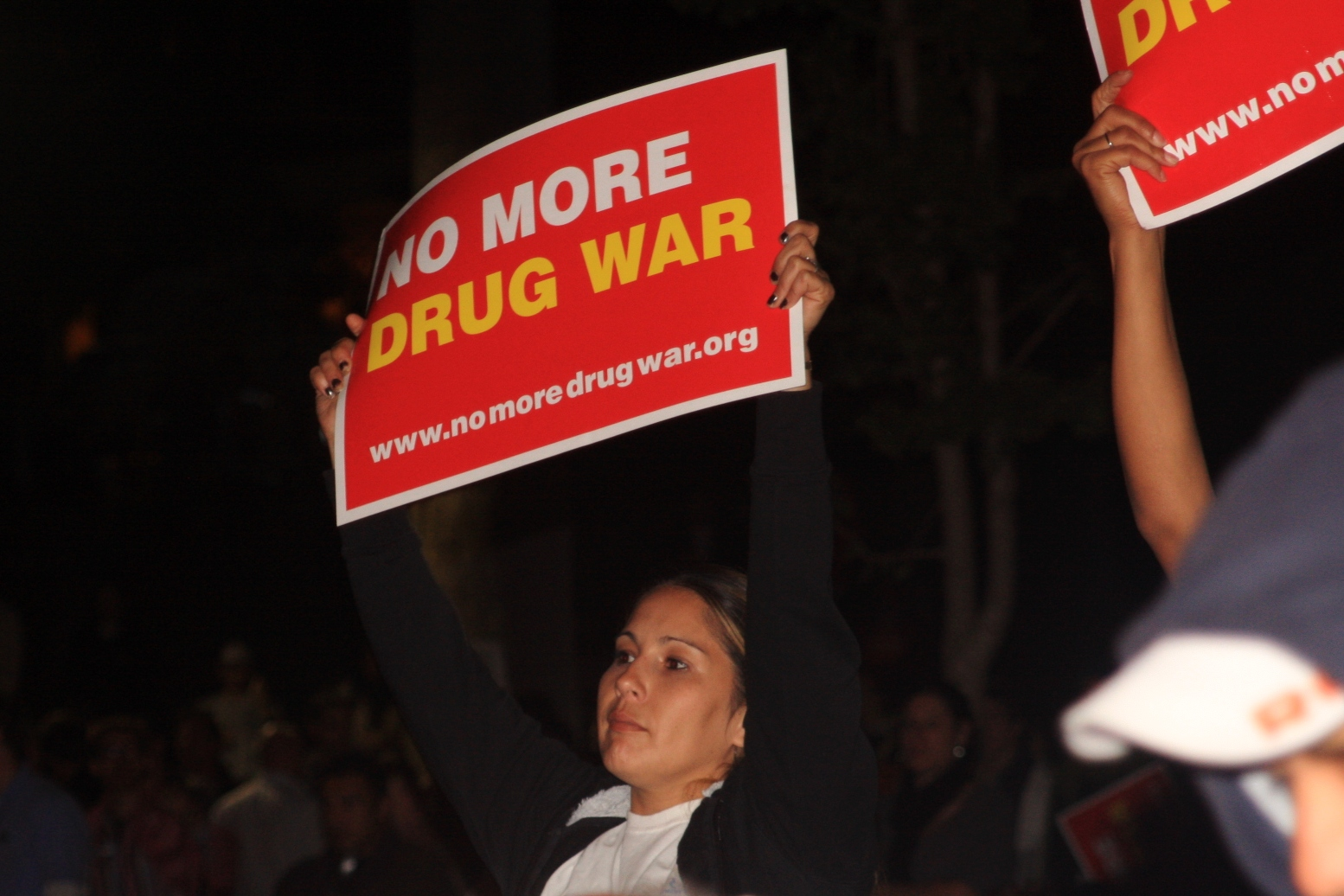

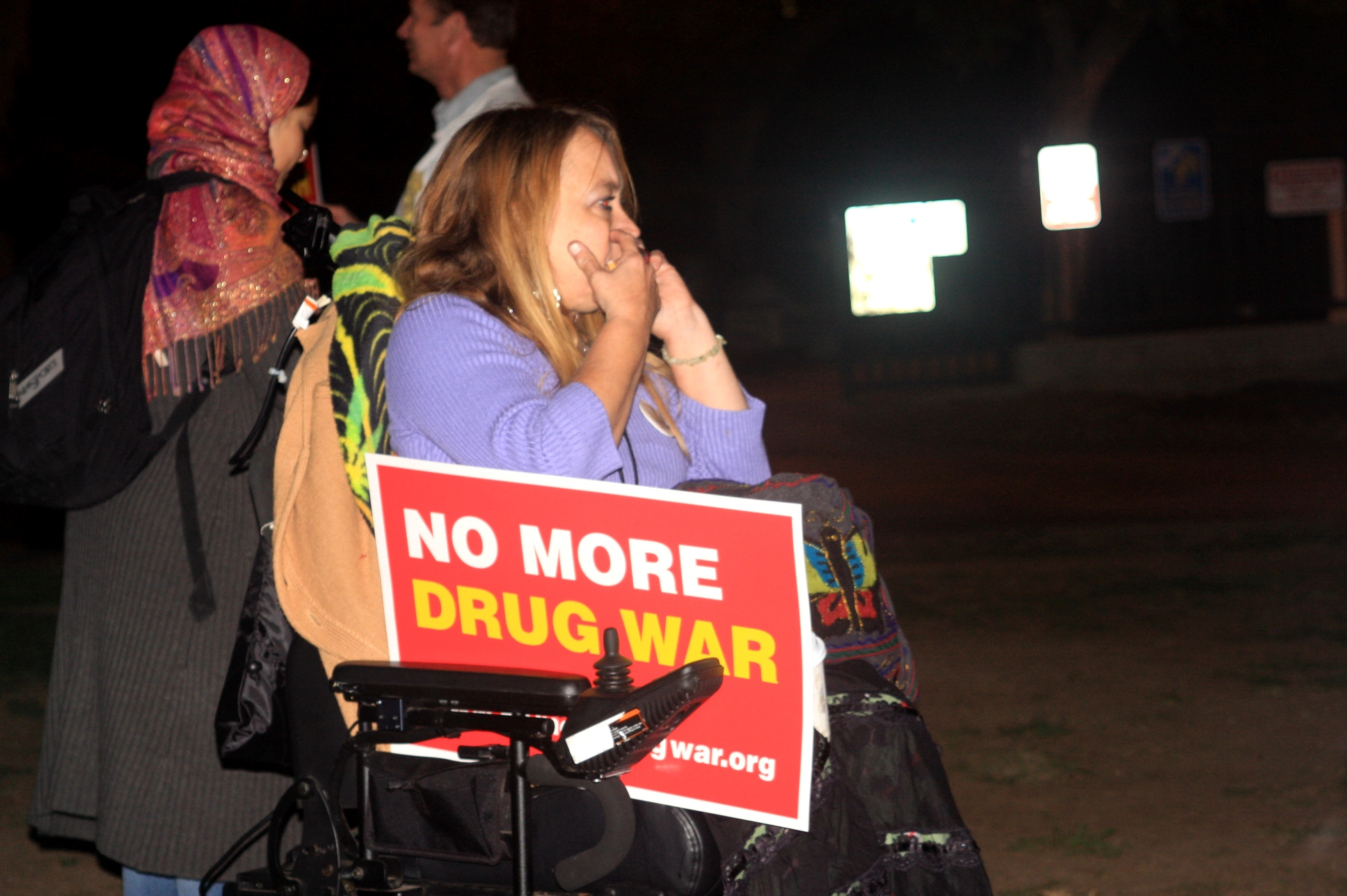

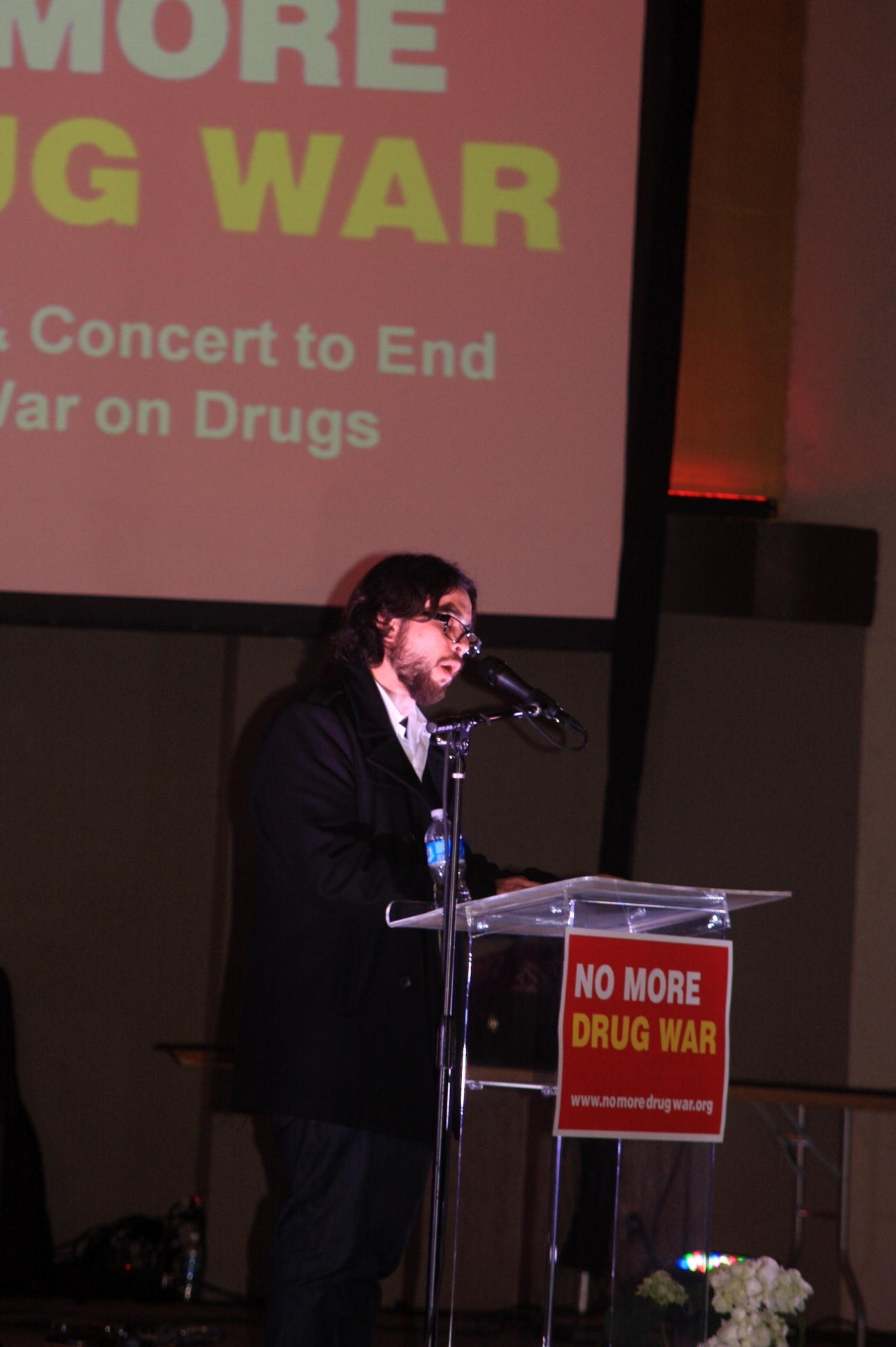

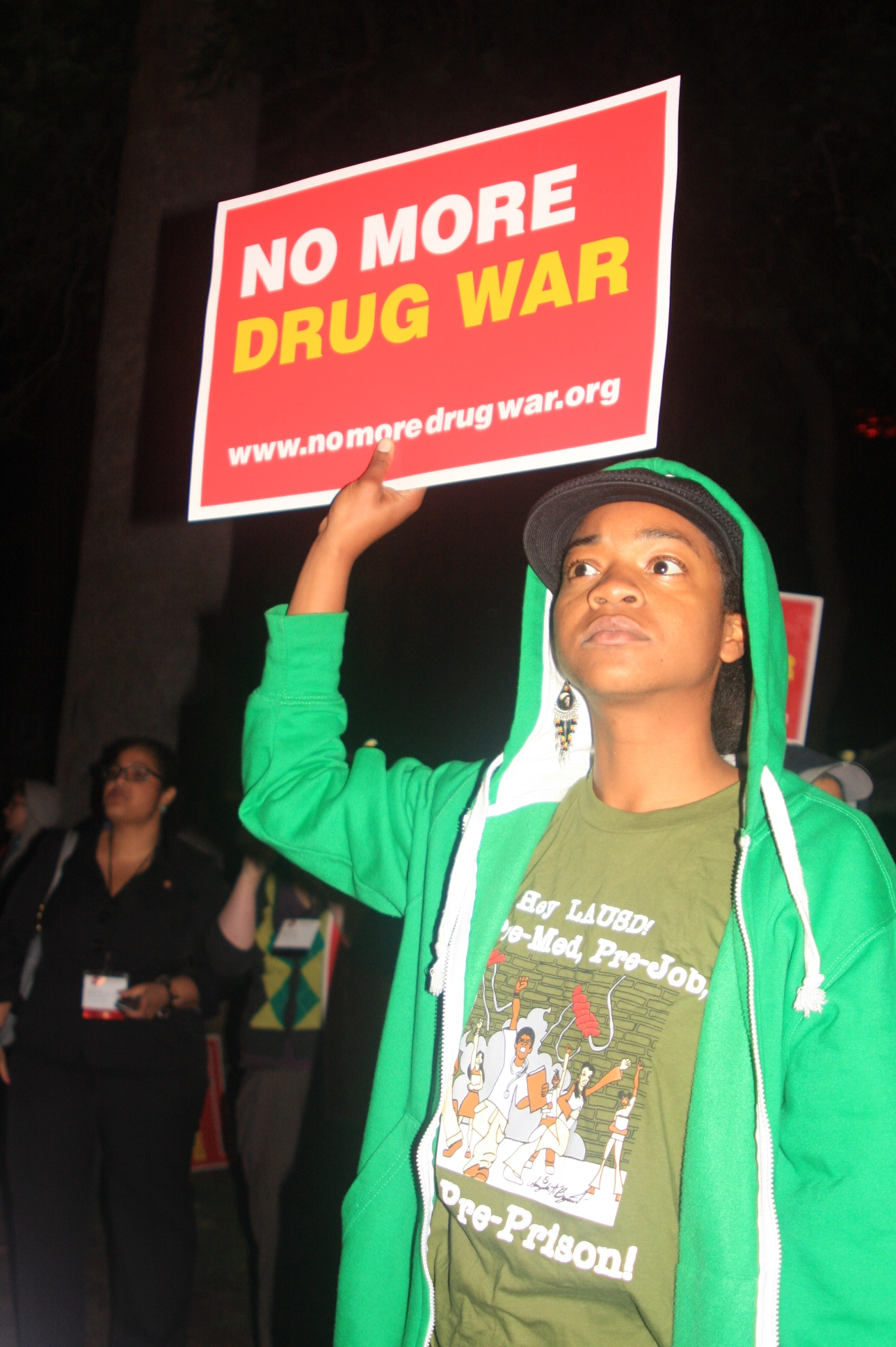

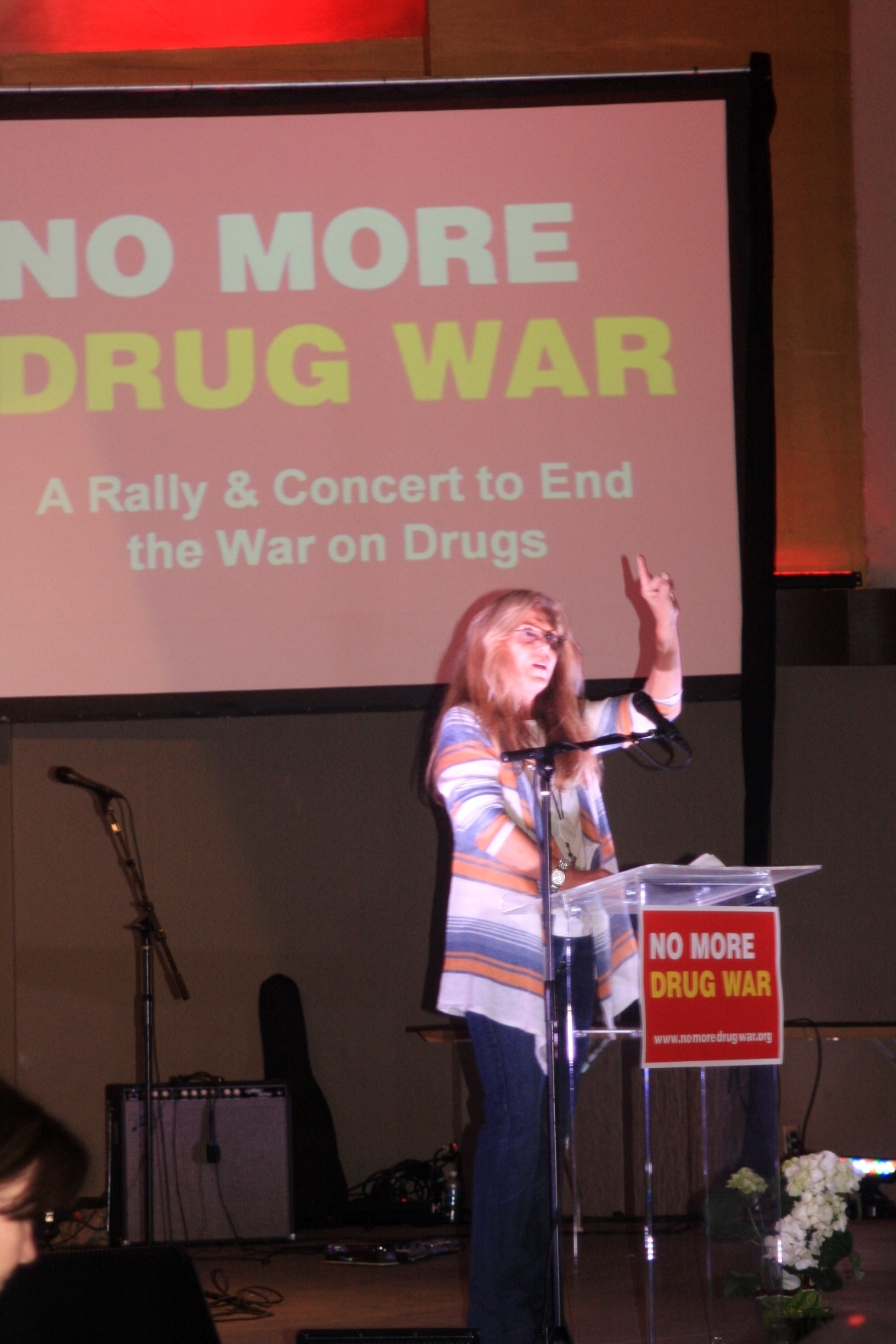

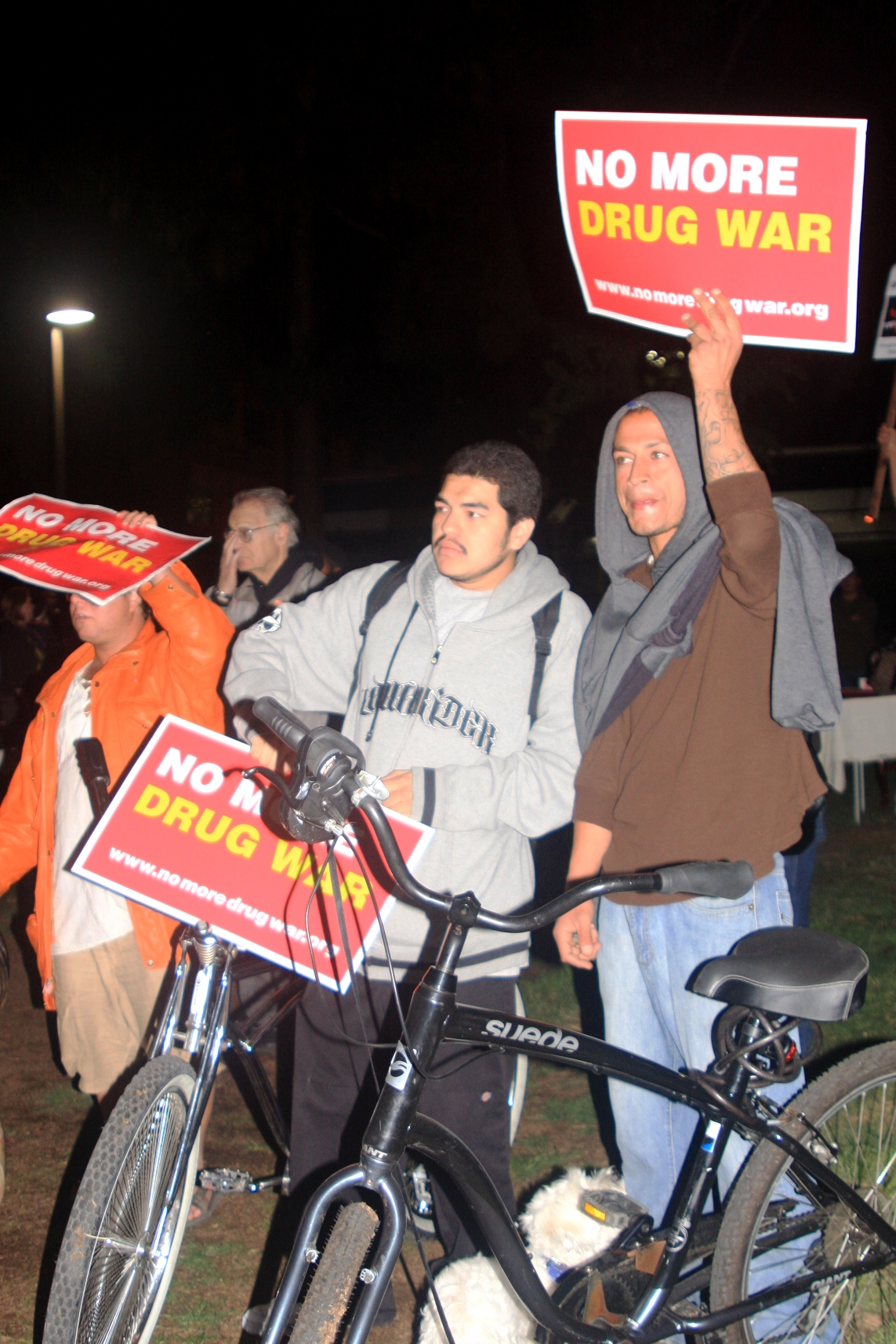

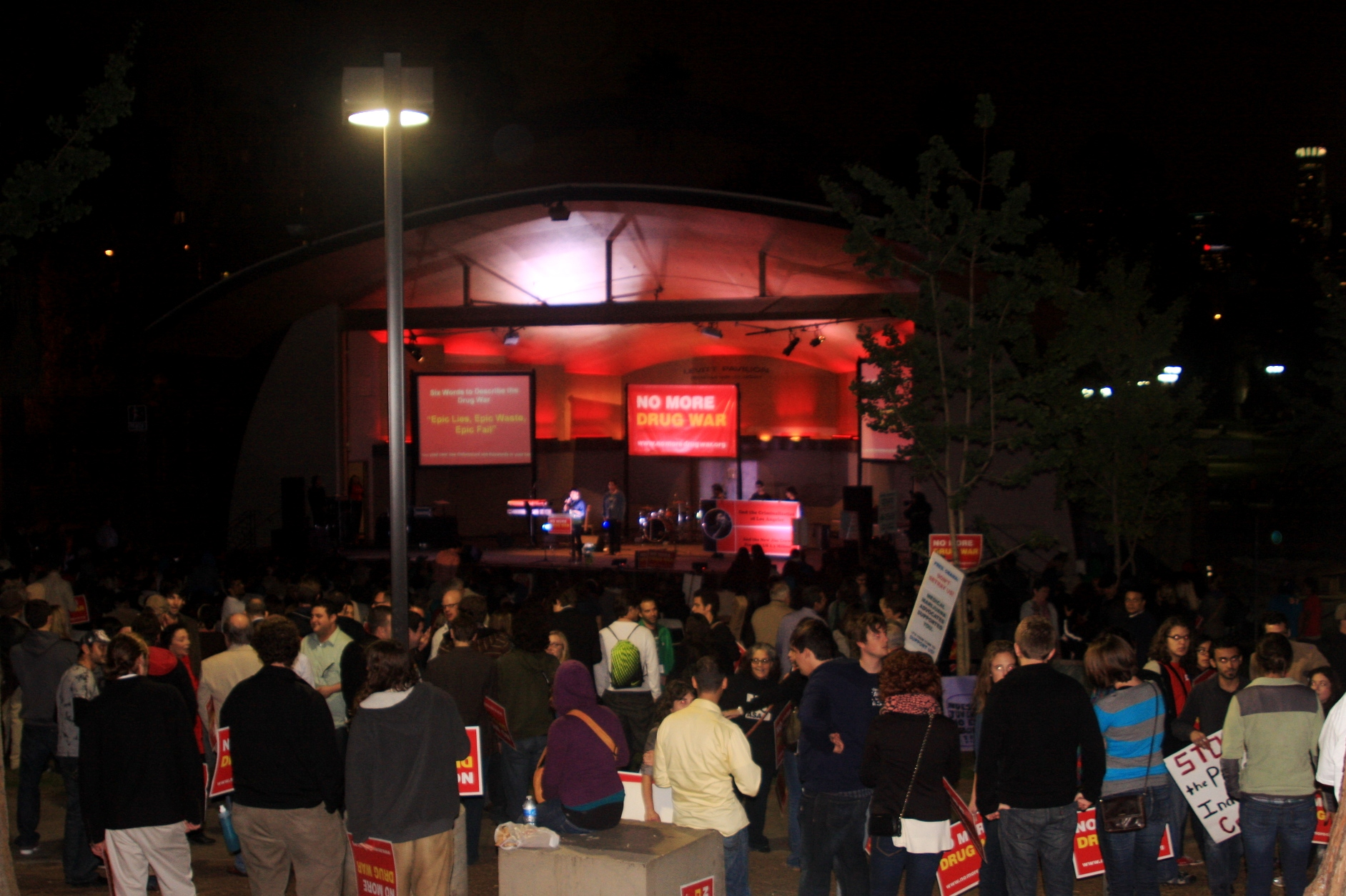

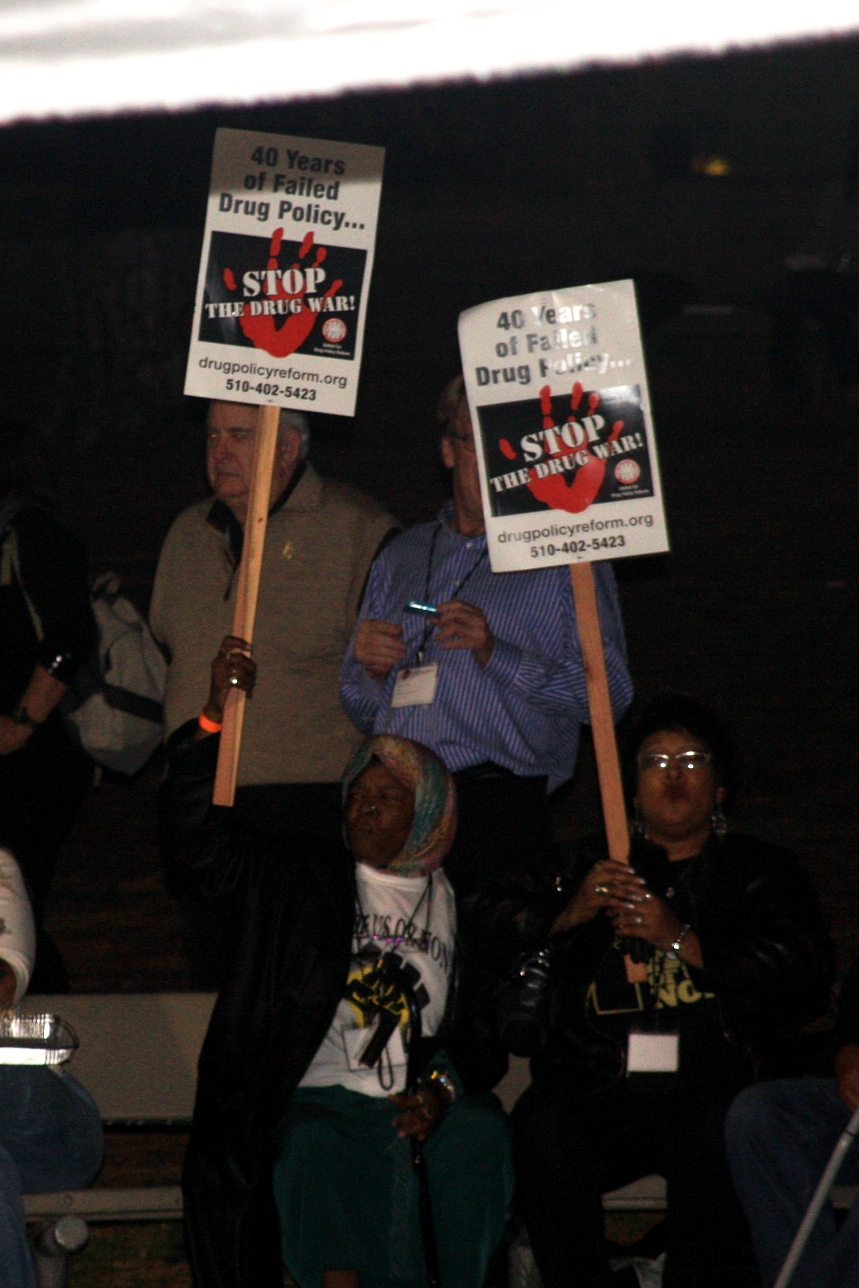

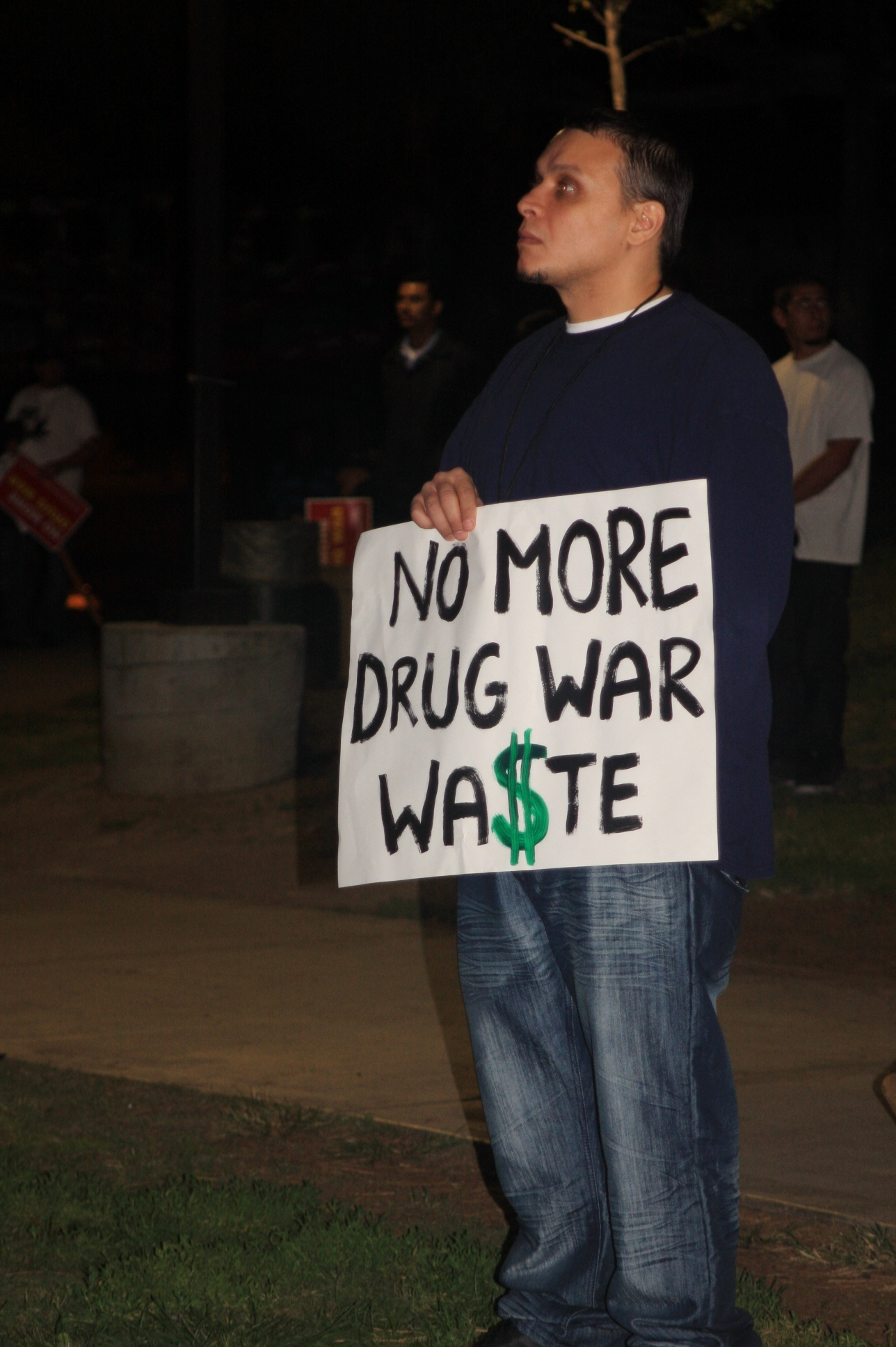

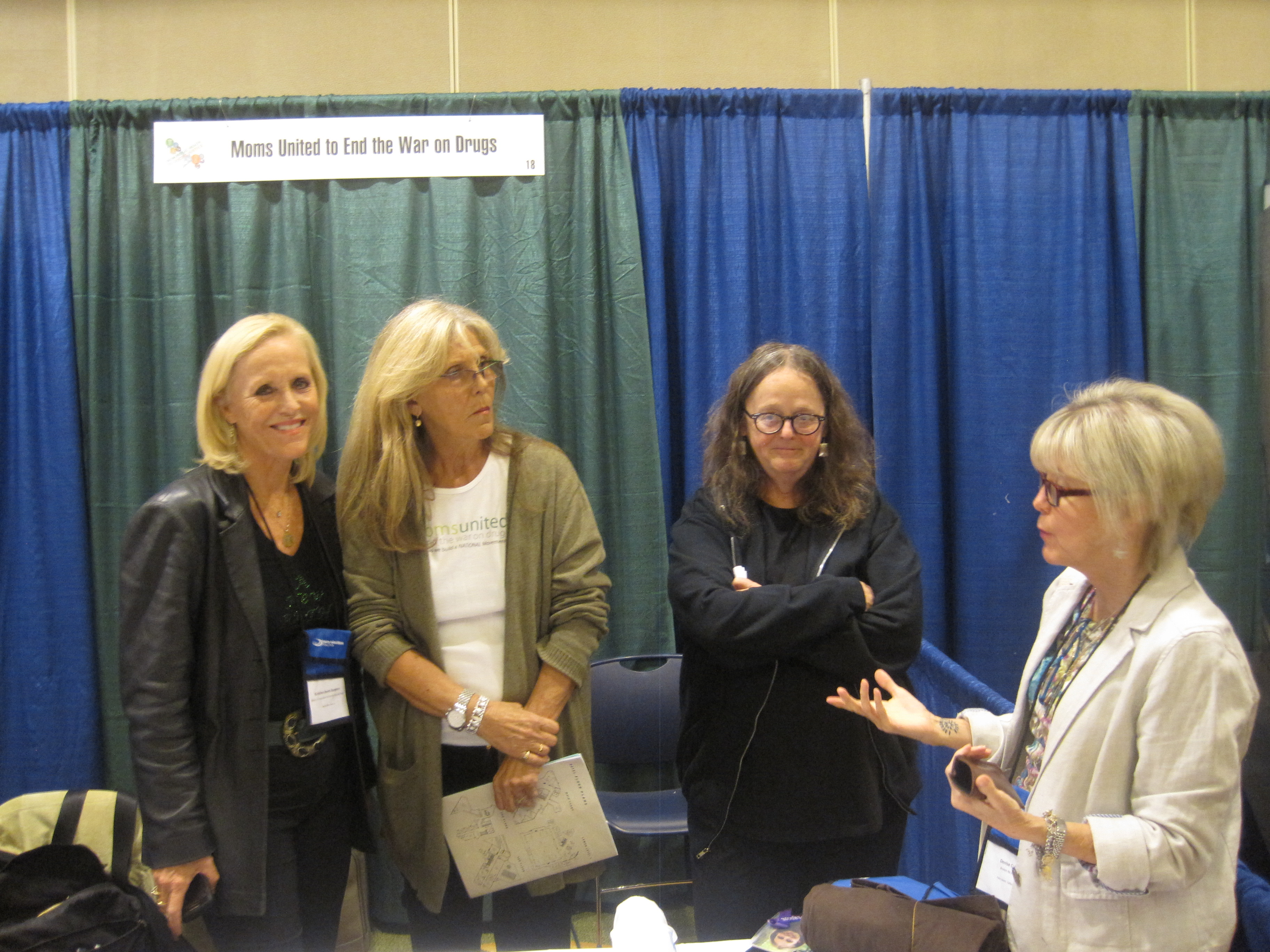

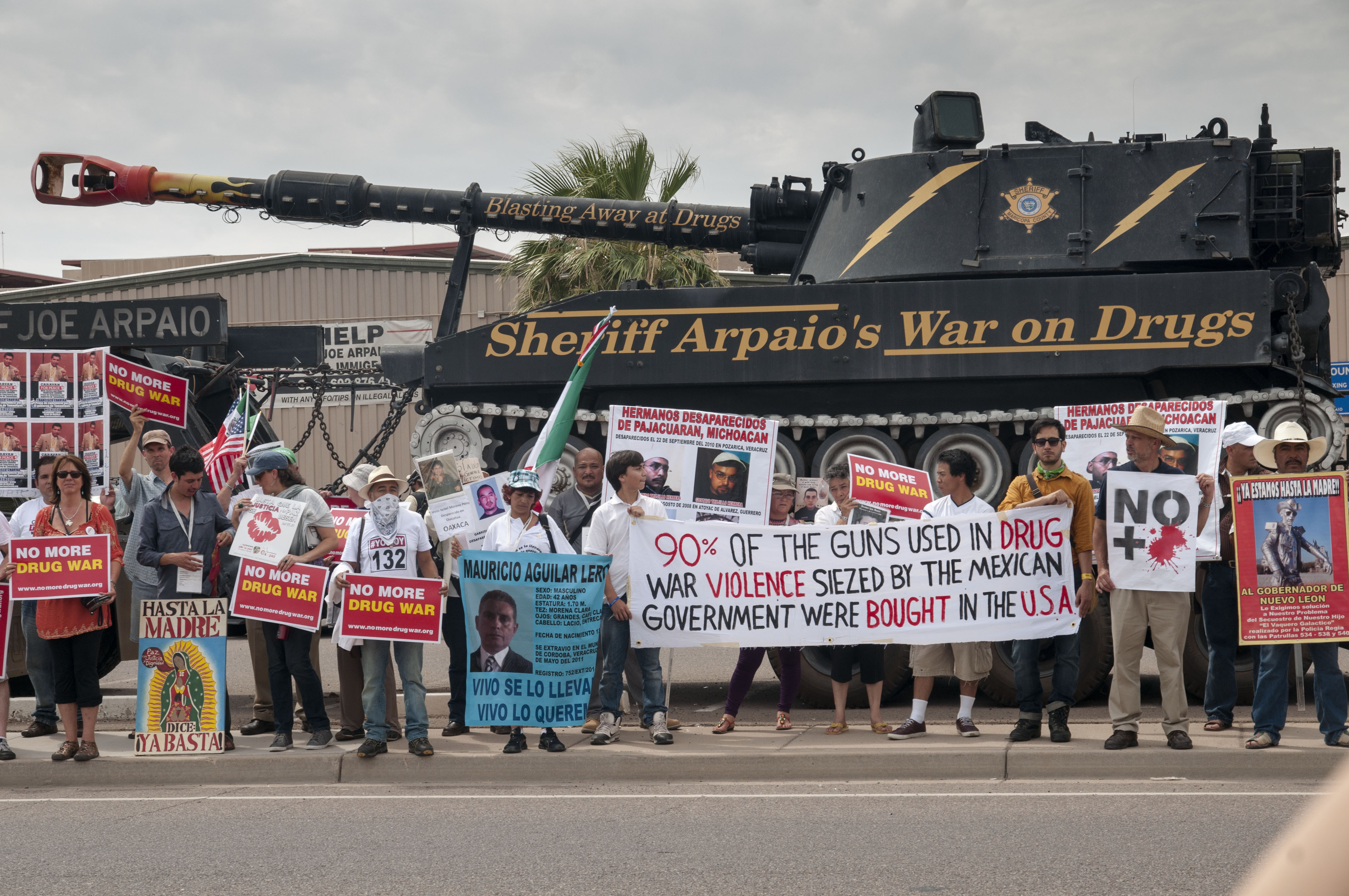

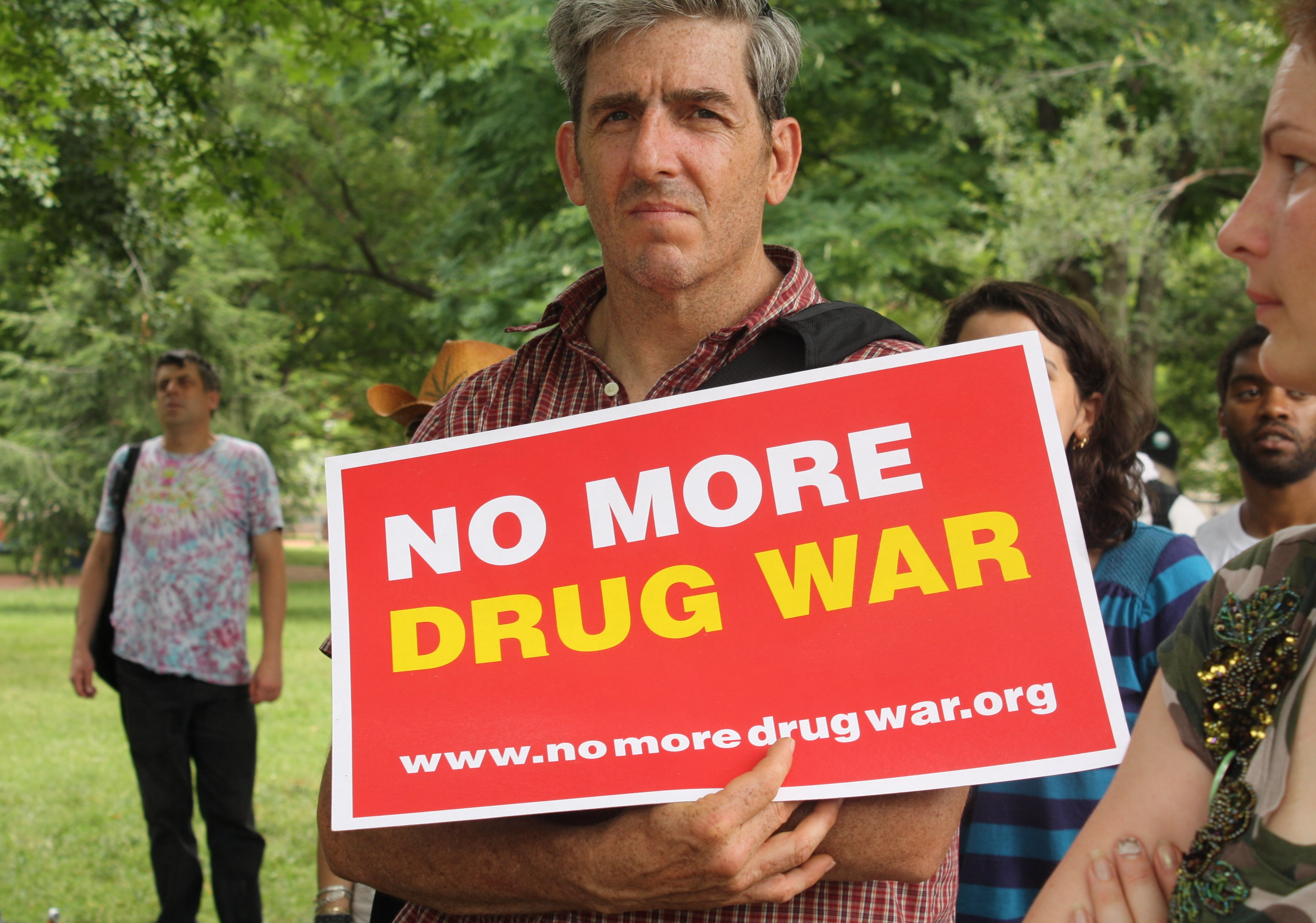

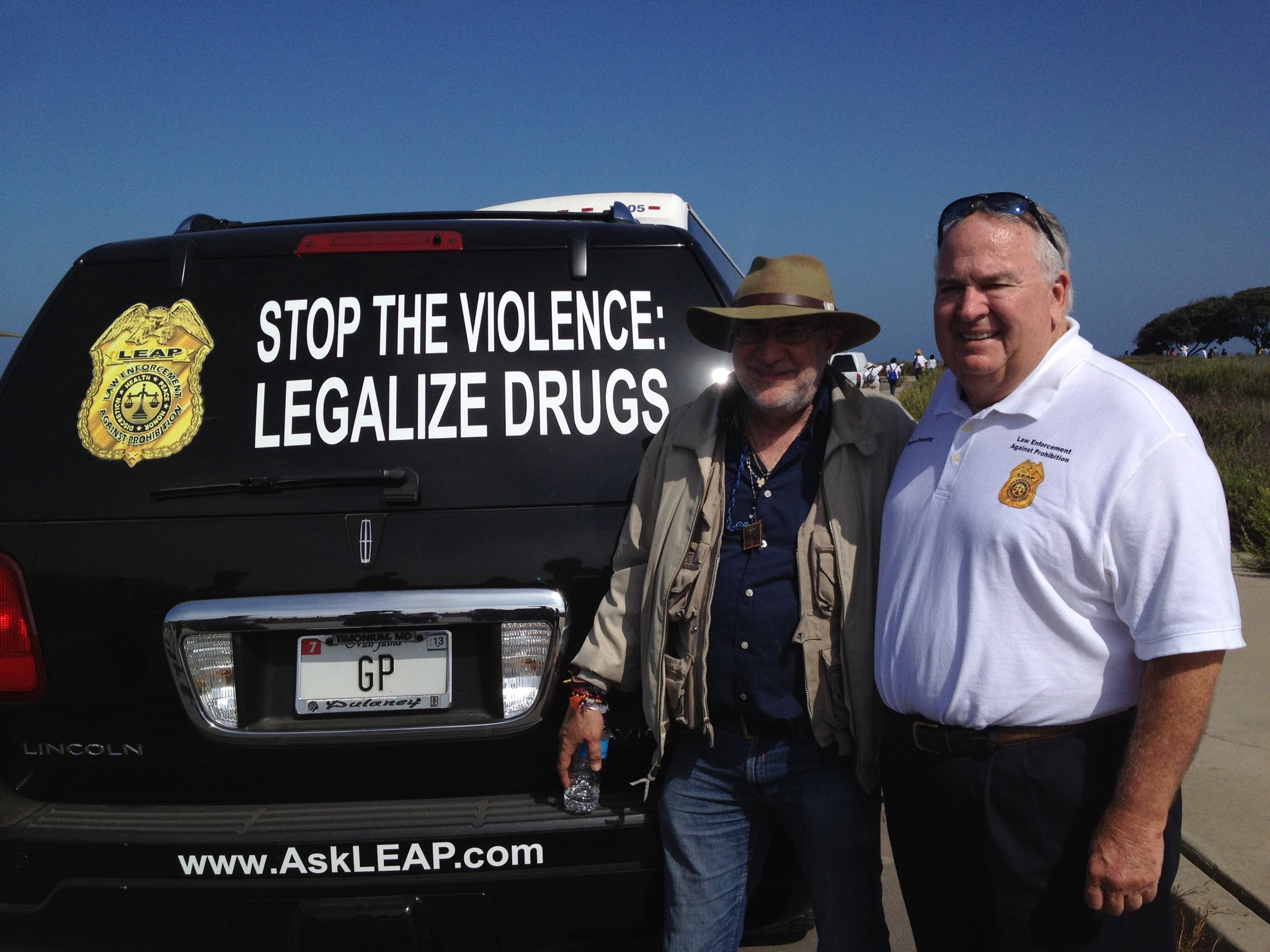

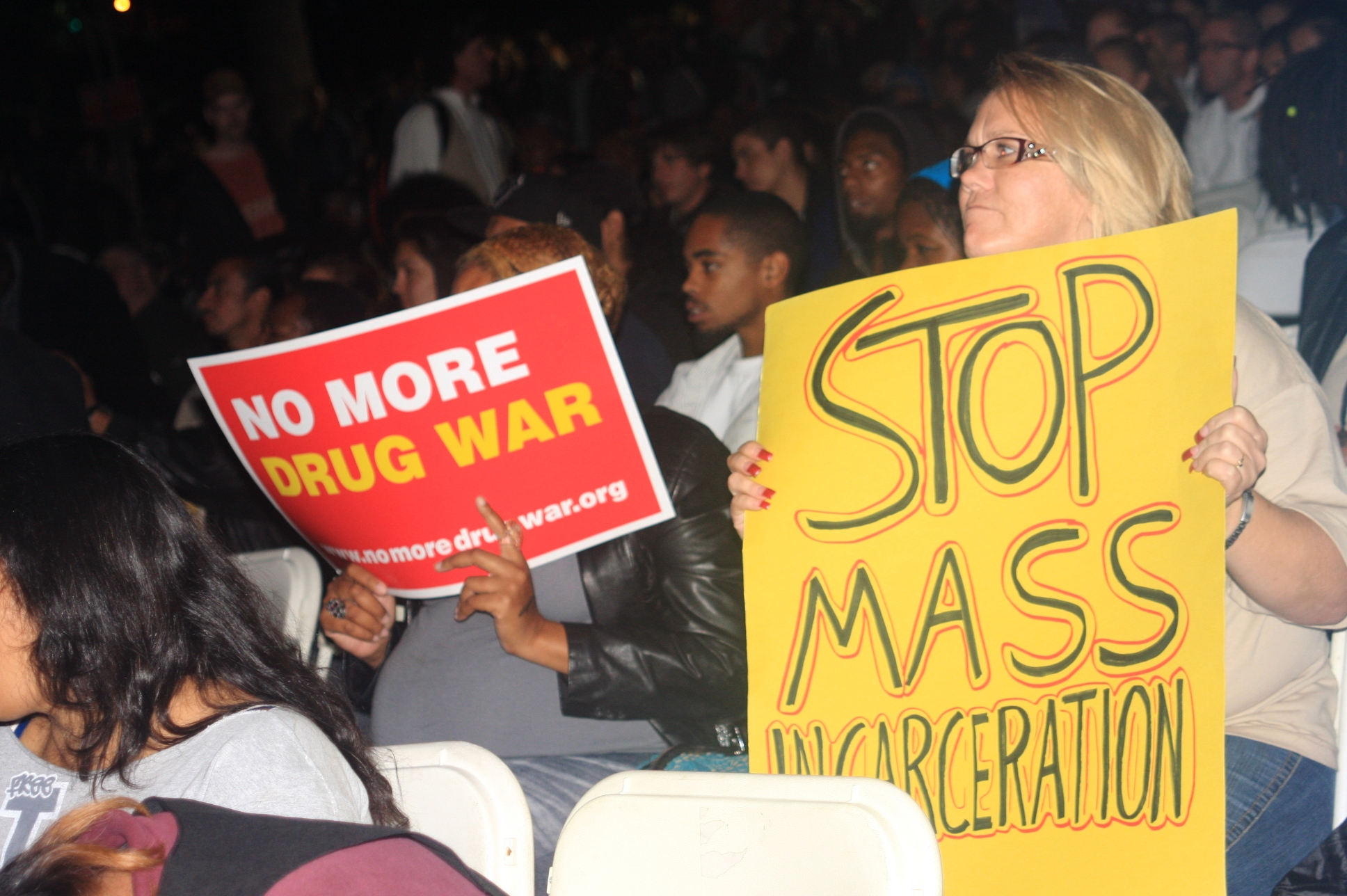

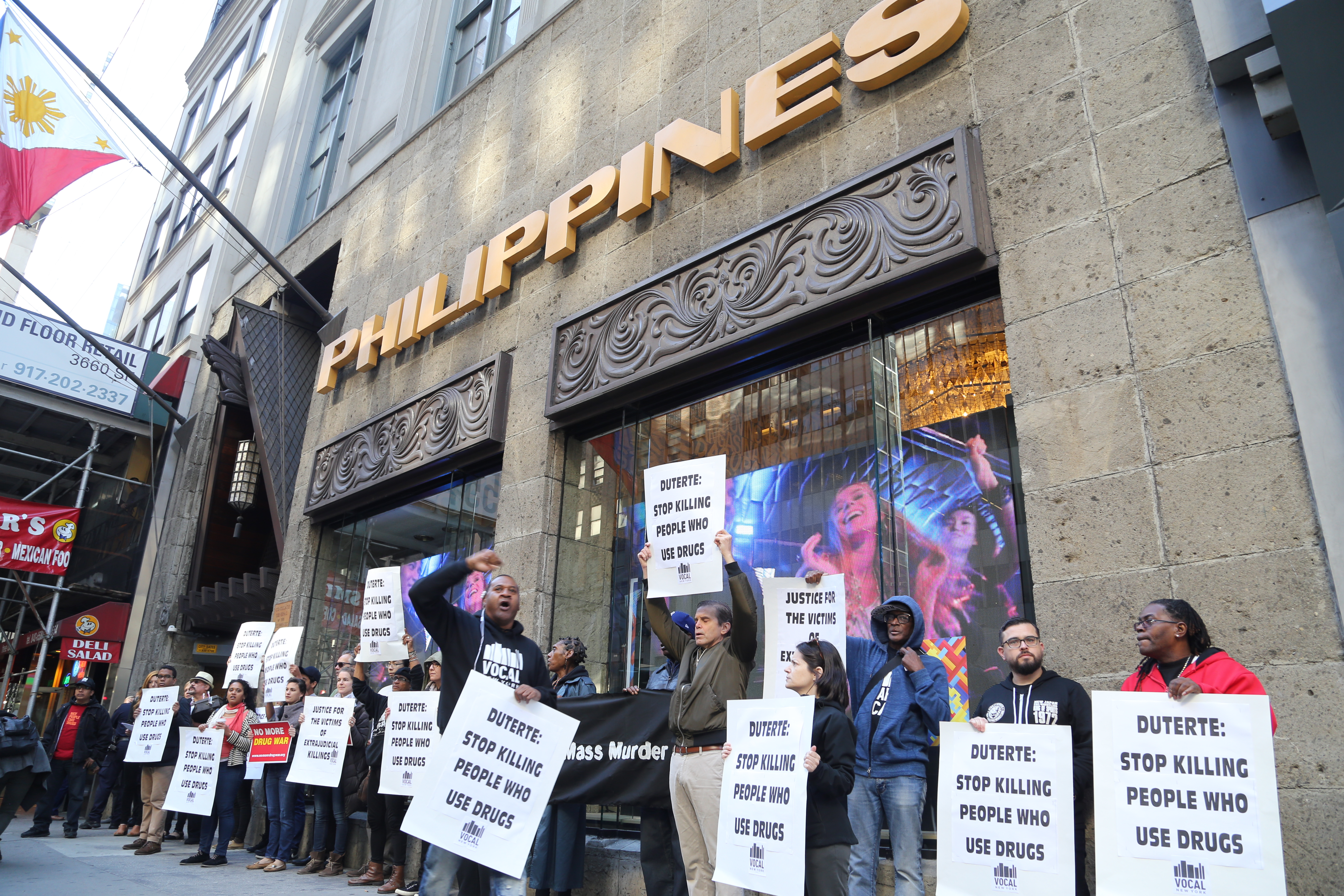

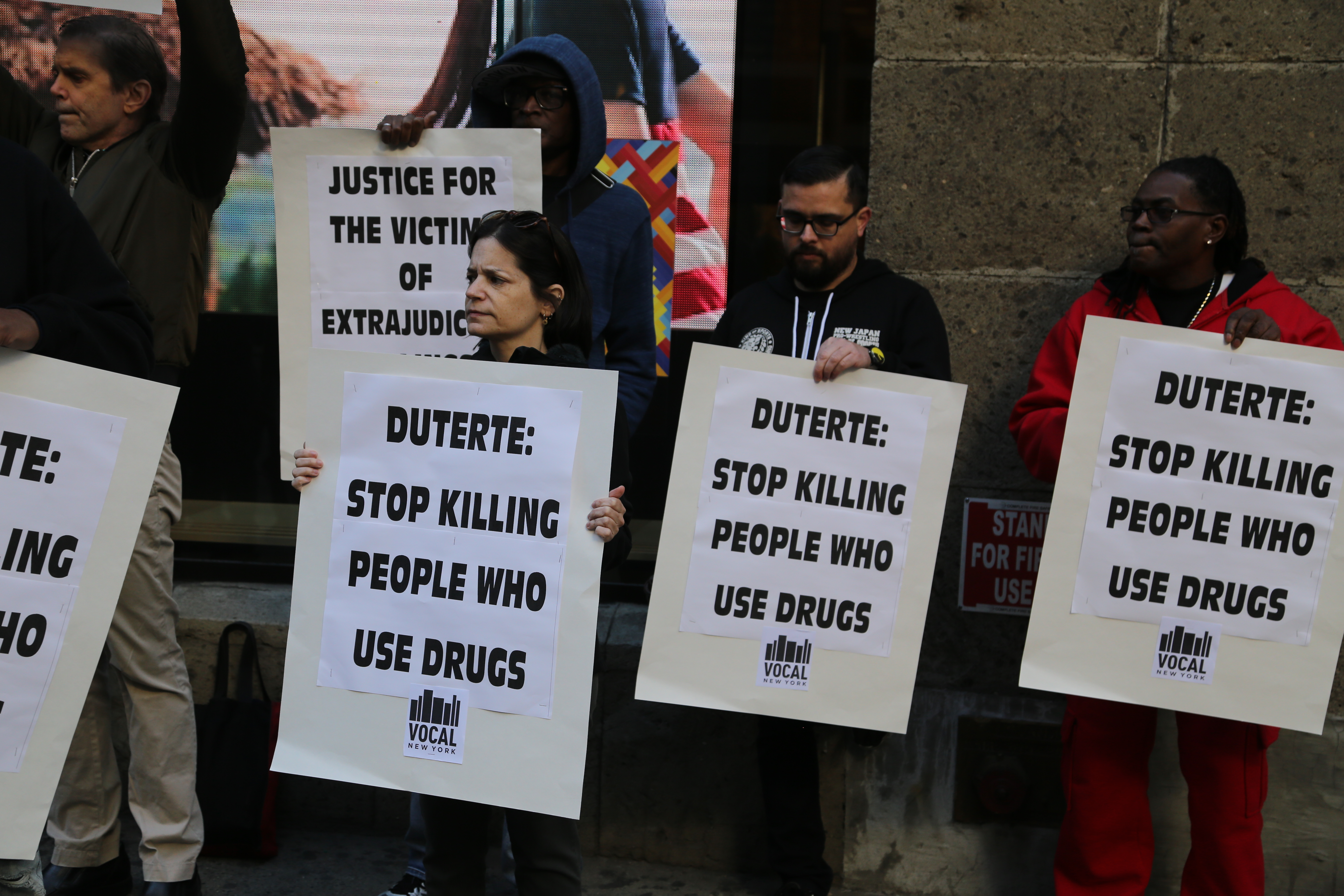

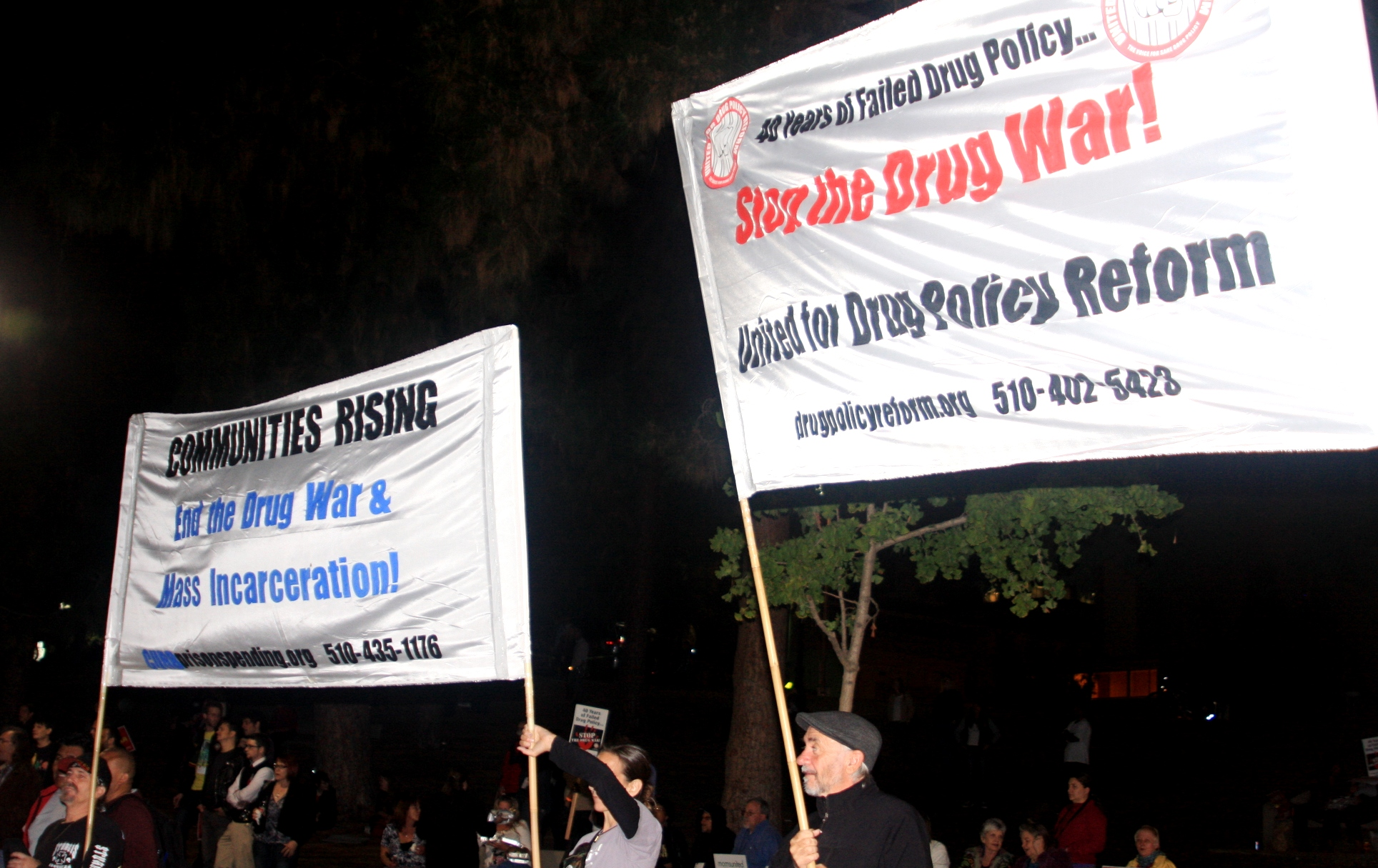

== See also ==
- Arguments for and against drug prohibition
- Cannabis rights
- Cannabis Social Club
- Chasing the Scream
- Civil libertarianism
- Cognitive liberty
- Gateway drug theory
- Global Commission on Drug Policy
- Harm reduction
- Latin American Initiative on Drugs and Democracy
- Left-libertarianism
- Legality of cannabis by country
- Psilocybin decriminalization in the United States
- Recreational drug use
- Responsible drug use
- School district drug policies
- Students for Sensible Drug Policy
- Supervised injection site
- The War We Never Fought
- Trans-European Drug Information
- U.S. Pure Food and Drug Act of 1906
- World Federation Against Drugs
