= Cannabis in Oregon =

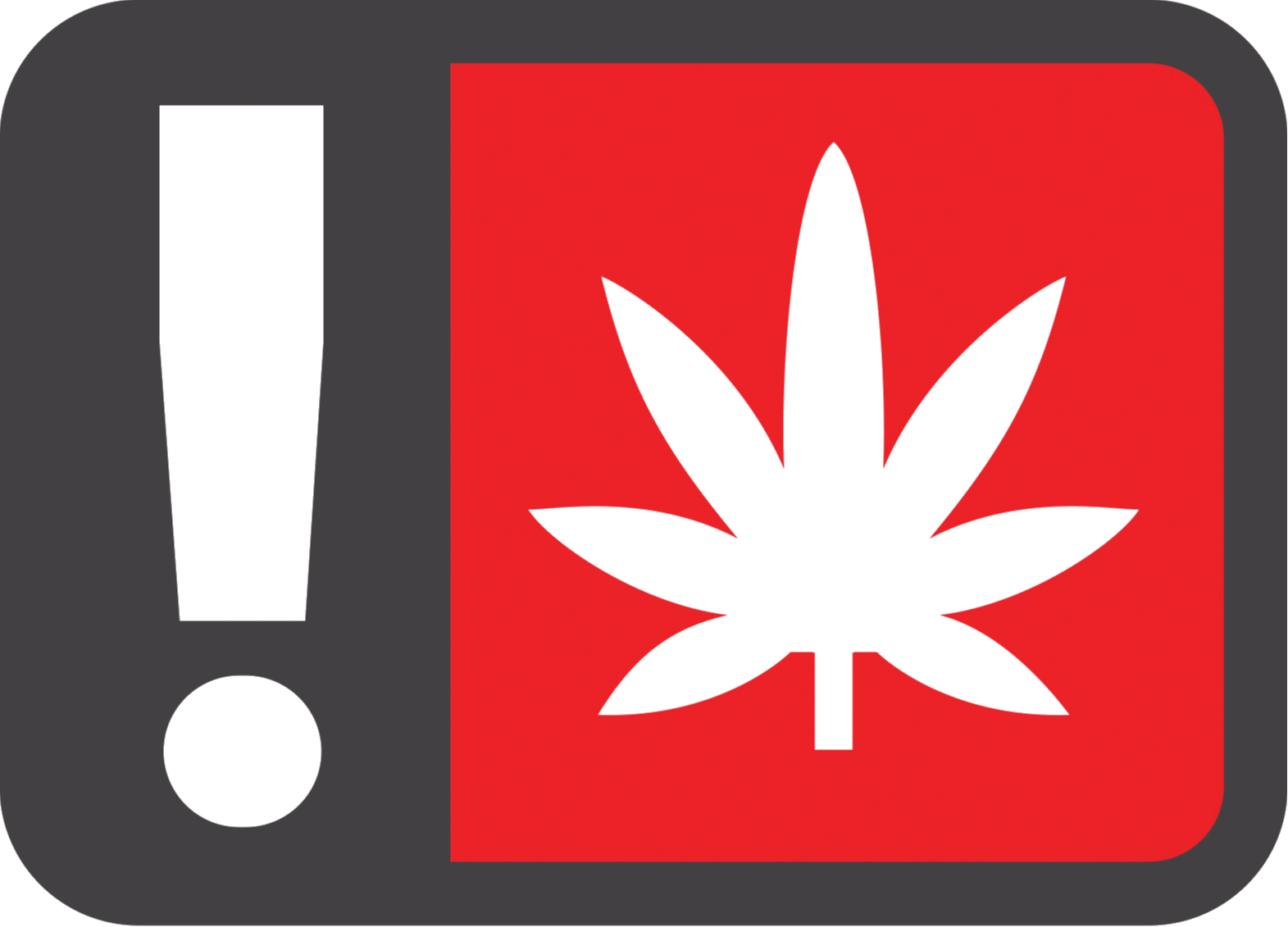
Oregon's Cannabis Universal Symbol

Cannabis in Oregon is legal for both medical and recreational use. In recent decades, the U.S. state of Oregon has had a number of legislative, legal and cultural events surrounding the use of cannabis (marijuana, hashish, THC, kief, etc.). Oregon was the first state to decriminalize the possession of small amounts of cannabis and authorize its use for medical purposes. An attempt to recriminalize the possession of small amounts of cannabis was turned down by Oregon voters in 1997.

From 1999 through 2005, the ratio of Oregonians using cannabis outpaced the general United States population by 32–45%. In surveys conducted in 1974 and 1975—one and two years after decriminalization—it was found that 2% of respondents said they did not use marijuana or cannabis because it was unavailable, 4% for legal or law enforcement reasons, 53% reported lack of interest, and 23% cited health dangers. The remaining 19% were using or had used it at one time.

Measure 91 was approved in 2014 by 56.1% of the vote, legalizing non-medical cultivation and uses of marijuana. It followed perennial and unsuccessful efforts to legalize marijuana by ballot initiative, including in 1986 and in 2012 which made it to the ballot, but voters rejected.

In 2015, Oregon Governor Kate Brown signed an emergency bill declaring marijuana sales legal to recreational users from dispensaries starting October 1, 2015. State officials began working on establishing a regulatory structure for sales of marijuana, and taxing of such sales, restructuring the existing Oregon Liquor Control Commission into the Oregon Liquor and Cannabis Commission (OLCC) to oversee it. Effective January 1, 2017, dispensaries were no longer permitted to sell cannabis for recreational use unless they applied for, and received, an OLCC license for such sales. During the one-month span from early December 2016 to early January 2017, the number of retailers licensed to sell recreational marijuana grew from 99 to 260, and hundreds more applications were received and being processed.

== Cannabis culture ==
=== Usage ===
According to the Drug Enforcement Administration (DEA), cannabis is readily available in Oregon. According to a 2006 report by the Substance Abuse and Mental Health Services Administration, in 2003–2004, Oregon ranked in the top fifth of states for cannabis usage in three age categories: 12 to 17, 18 to 25, and 26 and older. In 2005, while most states that had passed medical marijuana bills over the past decade saw marijuana use among teenagers decline faster than the national average (a 43% decrease), Oregon, Nevada, and Maine saw smaller decreases than the average.

The Substance Abuse and Mental Health Services Administration estimates and publishes the number of people to have used cannabis in the previous 30 days, as compiled by the Oregon chapter of the National Organization for the Reform of Marijuana Laws (NORML):

Year	Recent Oregon users	Recent U.S. users	Oregon vs. U.S. recent users
1999	6.60%	4.7%	+40%
2000	6.53%	4.8%	+36%
2001	7.19%	5.4%	+33%
2002	8.96%	6.2%	+45%
2003	8.88%	6.2%	+43%
2004	8.03%	6.1%	+32%
2005	8.36%	6.0%	+38%

=== Cultivation ===
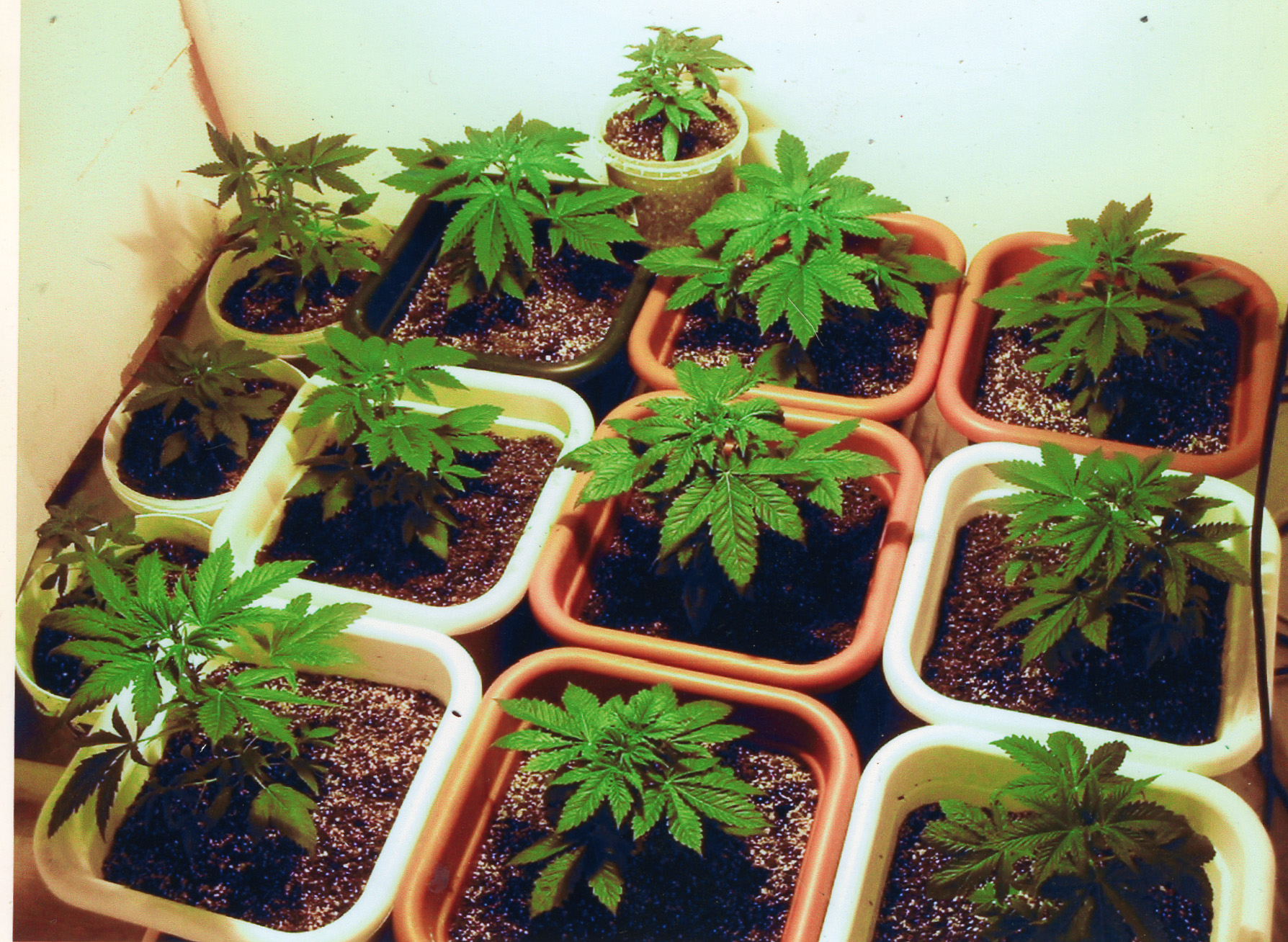
Indoor Cannabis cultivation

Large indoor and outdoor growing operations have been discovered on private, state, and forest lands, with plants numbering in thousands. Allegedly, large outdoor growing operations run by Mexican cartels drug trafficking were assumed to be operating in remote locations. Highly potent cannabis grown in Oregon is consumed locally, and distributed to other parts of the U.S.

In 1988, due to the success of the DEA's Campaign against Marijuana Planting in California, Oregon rivaled California nationally in cannabis production. In the 1990s, Oregon was a national leader in indoor cannabis cultivation, along with California, Washington, Kentucky and South Florida. For the decade ending in 1991, the DEA considered Oregon the "nation's cradle of indoor marijuana growing." In 2006, Oregon was the fourth largest indoor cannabis producing state, and the tenth largest cannabis producing state overall.

In Oregon, medical cannabis patients are allowed to grow up to six mature plants and 12 non-flowering plants in their residences. Designated growers in Oregon can cultivate up to six mature plants, 12 immature plants that are 24 inches or taller, and 36 immature plants below 24 inches for each patient they are responsible for. However, designated growers must acquire a marijuana grow site registration card for each patient. It's important to note that individuals with multiple convictions of Class A or Class B felonies are prohibited from growing marijuana in Oregon, as stated in Section 475C.792 of the Oregon Medical Marijuana Act.

=== Events and attitudes ===
According to Nick Budnick of the Willamette Week, medical marijuana has "helped legitimize pot culture in Oregon." In 2005, Multnomah County Circuit Judge Doug Beckman said "I think there's a broader social acceptance for users of marijuana. And gradually there's increasing public pressure, I think, to decriminalize marijuana."

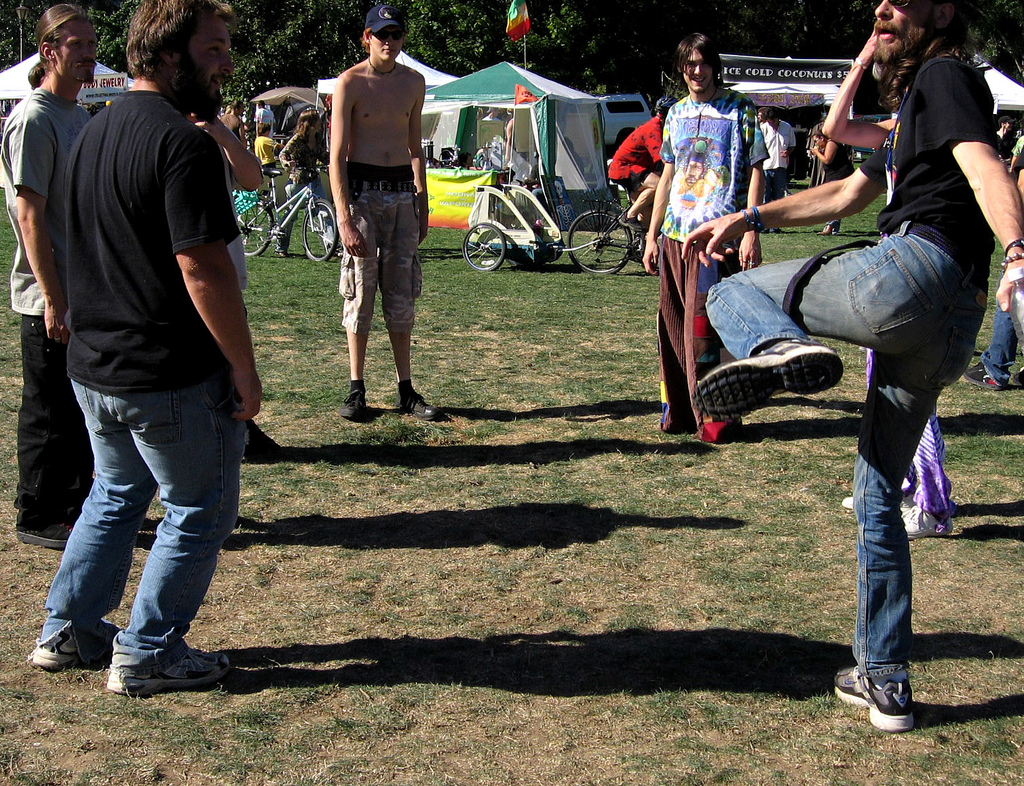
Festival goers at the 2007 Hempstalk in Portland, Oregon playing Hackey Sack

In 2007, nearly 20,000 people attended the third annual Hempstalk Festival at Sellwood Riverfront Park in Portland, Oregon. While organizers insisted smoking would not be tolerated, the smell of marijuana lingered in the air and some festival goers chose to consume various forms of cannabis foods. No festival attendees were arrested.

The first International Cannabis Business Conference (ICBC) took place in Portland, on September 13 and 14, 2014, at the Oregon Convention Center. The conference brought together entrepreneurs, professionals and advocates from across the globe, with the goal to further mainstream the global cannabis industry. The ICBC is a collaboration between veteran activists Anthony Johnson, Alex Rogers and Debby Goldsberry. Johnson has served as chief petitioner of statewide cannabis reforms and is currently Director of the Oregon Cannabis Industry Association; Rogers is CEO of Northwest Alternative Health and lead producer of the Oregon Medical Marijuana Business Conference; Goldsberry is a co-founder of the Berkeley Patients Group and serves as an ambassador for Magnolia Wellness. The ICBC further cements Portland as a prominent locale for cannabis activism.

== Legal history ==
=== Prohibition ===
Amidst a nationwide trend of cannabis prohibition, the State of Oregon outlawed cannabis in 1923. In 1935, the State of Oregon passed the Uniform State Narcotic Drug Act, bringing Oregon's laws regarding cannabis in line with the majority of states.

=== Decriminalization ===
… the solution is not to toss youthful offenders into jail or prisons. We long ago recognized alcoholism to be a disease, and abandoned efforts to treat alcoholics simply by locking them up.

— Oregon Governor Tom McCall, who signed the nation's first legislation decriminalizing certain marijuana offenses in 1973.

In 1973, Oregon became the first state to decriminalize cannabis. Possession of 28.35 grams (1 ounce) or less is a violation (not a crime) punishable by a $500 to $1,000 fine; stricter punishments exist for sale or cultivation. Possession of 1 ounce to 110 grams is a class B felony punishable by 10 years in prison, and possession of more than 110 grams is a felony with punishment depending on the defendant's prior record.

The Oregon Decriminalization Bill of 1973 abolished criminal penalties for possession of small amounts of marijuana. As a result, possession of up to an ounce of marijuana in Oregon was a violation (not a crime), punishable only by a fine of $500 to $1000. There is one exception, however, which is: if possession of such an amount occurs in a public place within 1000 feet of a school attended by minors, the person committing the offense is guilty of a Class C misdemeanor instead. Possession of more than one ounce, no matter the proximity to a school, was a Class B felony until July 3, 2013, at which point it became a Class B misdemeanor. The actual use of marijuana in private, and being under the influence of marijuana, are not punishable offenses under Oregon law. However, public use, and also driving under the influence of intoxicants are punishable offenses.

Intentionally growing even one marijuana plant (Unlawful manufacture of marijuana), was a Class A felony in Oregon (ORS 475.856, 475.858) until July 1, 2015. Selling or giving away marijuana was an offense (Unlawful delivery of marijuana) that varied in severity and penalty depending on the amount of marijuana involved in the transaction, whether or not consideration was involved, the relative ages of the people involved, and the proximity of the transaction to nearby schools attended by minors (ORS 475.860, 475.862). Giving away five grams (approx. 0.18oz) of marijuana or less by an adult to another adult for no payment at a location at least 1000 feet from the closest school was only a violation, punishable by a fine of $500 to $1000. However, if greater amounts of marijuana were involved, if any payment at all were involved, if delivery was by an adult to a minor, and/or if delivery occurred within 1000 feet of a school (even if both parties are adults), the severity of the offense ranged from Class C misdemeanor to Class A felony with increasing penalties.

In 1986, Oregon's Ballot Measure 5 sought to legalize cannabis. The Oregon Marijuana Initiative spent about $50,000 promoting the proposition, and collected the 87,000 signatures necessary to place it on the ballot. In 1986, by some estimates, cannabis was Oregon's largest cash crop, estimated in 1985 at between $1 billion and $1.15 billion. The ballot measure was rejected by Oregon voters with 279,479 "Yes" and 781,922 "No" votes, or 26.33% support.

In 1995, Oregon House Bill 3466, which would have recriminalized marijuana in Oregon, died. According to bill sponsor Jerry Grisham (R–Beavercreek), HB 3466 was meant to counter a circulating initiative petition called The Oregon Cannabis Tax Act of 1997, which would have allowed state liquor stores to sell marijuana and permitted hemp production for paper, fabric, oil, and protein. Taxes on these products would go to schools to replace funding allegedly lost by Measure 5. The petition was sponsored by a political action committee named Pay for Schools by Regulating Cannabis. Cannabis activists Paul Stanford and Chris Iverson were the chief petitioners for the Oregon Cannabis Tax Act of 1997.

HB 3466 would have increased penalties for possession of under an ounce of marijuana from an infraction (traffic ticket-like offense) to a Class A misdemeanor, the worst non-felony offense, with a fine of $100 to $1,000 per gram, up to a maximum of $5,000. The bill also would have created a new crime—being under the influence of marijuana—punishable by a fine of up to $5,000. The bill would have passed according to the positions of state senators, but was blocked on a technical basis which prevented it from coming to the floor the same day it was read—which allows public input—unless overridden by a vote.

In 1997, the Oregon Legislature passed House Bill 3643, making the possession of less than an ounce of marijuana a Class C misdemeanor, which added a possible jail sentence of up to 30 days. According to Eric Schlosser of Rolling Stone, John Kitzhaber, then Oregon's governor, signed the bill because he did not want to appear soft on crime. Activists opposing HB 3643 collected twice as many signatures as were required to force a referendum on the bill. John Sperling, Peter Lewis, and George Soros were the principal financial backers of the referendum signature drive. Measure 57, which would have upheld HB 3643, was turned down by a margin of 2–1.

The Oregonians For Cannabis Reform 2010 hoped to make cannabis products legal and available in a retail environment by enacting the Oregon Cannabis Tax Act of 2010 (OCTA), but the effort failed to collect the minimum 83,000 signatures by the July 2 deadline to qualify for the 2010 ballot. Backers of the initiative said 90% of the proceeds from the state's sale of marijuana would have gone to Oregon's general fund (as much as $300 million), lowering the state tax burden, while 10% of the revenue would have been used to fund drug abuse education and treatment programs. Advocates claimed the marijuana market would be removed from the underground economy, where young people and drug abusers often take control, and place it in liquor stores regulated by the Oregon Liquor Control Commission (OLCC) so that the minimum age of 21 could be enforced. According to Madeline Martinez, Executive Director of NORML's Oregon chapter, U.S. Congressman Barney Frank (D–Massachusetts) endorsed the idea, though support from Oregon state officials had been limited.

=== Medical cannabis ===
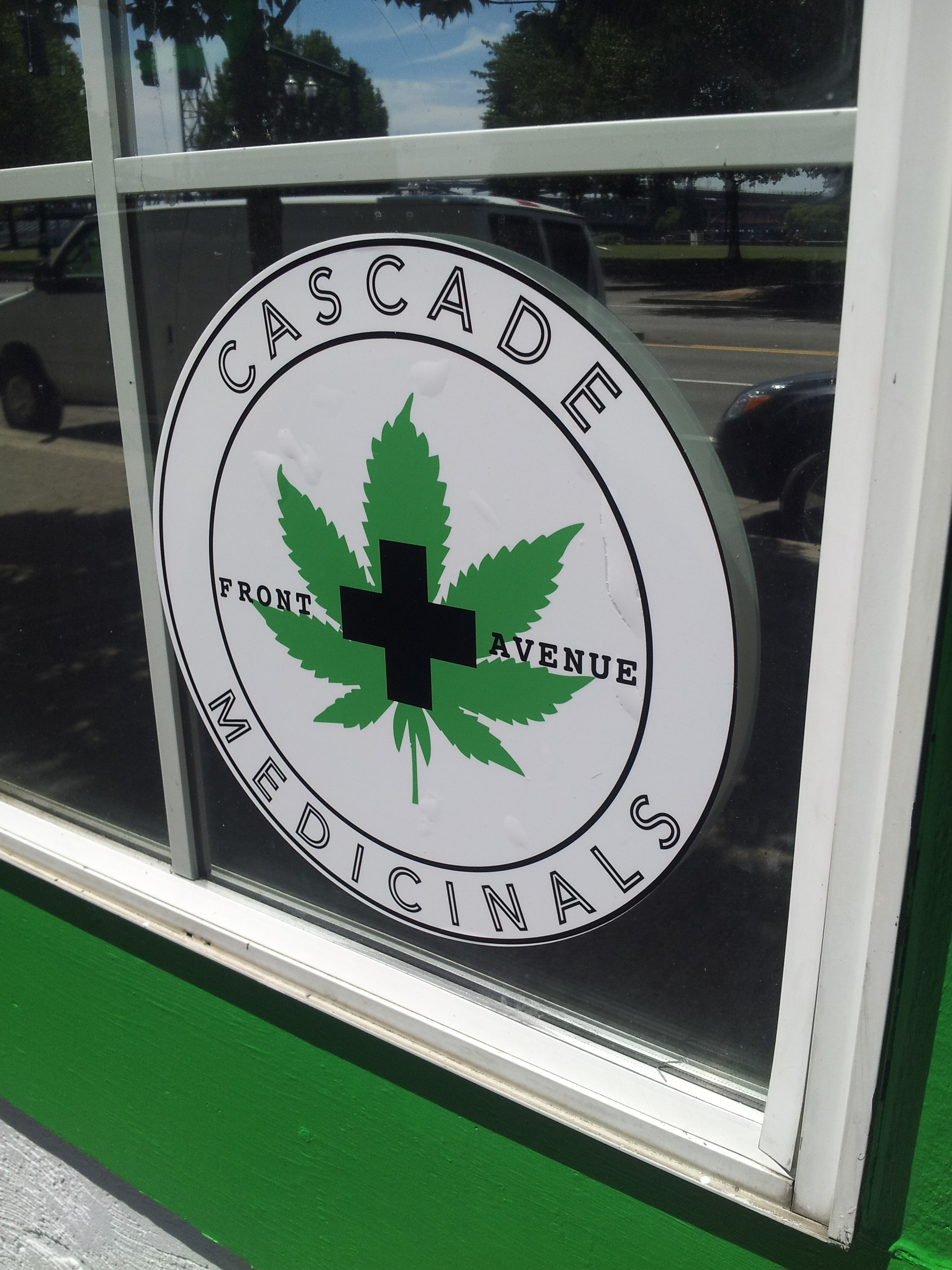
Cannabis dispensary in Portland

Oregon marijuana law is further complicated due to the existence of Oregon's medical marijuana program. The Oregon Medical Marijuana Program allows individuals with a medical history of one or more qualifying illnesses and a doctor's recommendation to apply for registration with the program. Accepted applicants are issued a Medical Marijuana Card, which entitles them to different treatment under the law. Essentially, medical marijuana patients are allowed to possess, without fear of citation, arrest, or penalty, up to 1.5 pounds of marijuana at a time. Possession of a greater amount, however, does become punishable by law. In addition to legal possession, cardholders may also legally grow, without fear of citation, arrest, or penalty, up to 18 immature cannabis plants and 6 mature ones at a single time. Cardholders are also allowed to designate a primary caregiver and a grower of their choice, if so inclined. These people enjoy the same freedoms, in regard to possession, as the cardholder as long as they remain officially registered. The above limits of legal possession apply to the total combined property of the cardholder, caregiver, and grower. If a grower is growing plants for more than one cardholder, he or she may possess up to 18 immature plants per cardholder. A grower may not grow plants for more than four cardholders at a time. Also, in addition to legal possession and manufacture as outlined above, cardholders, caregivers, and growers may legally deliver marijuana to each other, and to other cardholders, so long as the delivery is made without consideration. The privileges which normally protect cardholders, caregivers, and growers from citation, arrest, and penalty do not excuse possession, manufacture, or delivery in cases where they are simultaneously guilty of certain offenses listed in ORS 475.316, such as driving under the influence of marijuana or using marijuana in public.

In 1994, Portland cannabis activist Chris Iverson, who was chairman of the NW Hemp Foundation opened the first cannabis buyers club in Oregon. Mr. Iverson was quoted as saying "Sure, working within the system is the best way. But we've been robbed of this resource for too many years."

The Oregon Medical Marijuana Act was established by Ballot Measure 67, a citizens' initiative, in November 1998, the same election as the referendum Measure 57. It modified state law to allow the cultivation, possession, and use of marijuana by prescription by patients with certain medical conditions. The ballot measure passed by a margin of 54.6% to 45.4%. The Act does not affect federal law, which still prohibits the cultivation and possession of marijuana. Bernie Hobson, spokesman for the DEA's Seattle regional office, said "From a federal standpoint, there is no such thing as medical marijuana." Four other western states (Alaska, Arizona, Nevada and Washington) and the District of Columbia passed similar measures legalizing the use of marijuana for medical purposes in the same election.

The act created "The Oregon Medical Marijuana Program," which administers the Medical Marijuana Act approved by the public in November 1998. The Oregon Medical Marijuana Program administers the program within the Oregon Department of Human Services. As of April 1, 2009, there were 20,974 patients registered, with 10,626 caregivers holding cards for these patients. Virtually all patients benefiting from the program (18,000+) suffer from severe pain and more than 3,200 from nausea. The other conditions are given as epilepsy, HIV/AIDS, cancer, cachexia, chronic glaucoma and tremors caused by Alzheimer's disease. Multiple states have requested information on Oregon's program to use as a model for their own medical marijuana initiatives and registration systems.

In 2004, an Oregon ballot measure that would have increased the amount of cannabis a patient can legally possess to six pounds was defeated by Oregon voters. In 2005, the Oregon Medical Marijuana Program brought in more than $900,000 to the state's budget for the Department of Human Services.

In June 2010, the Oregon Board of Pharmacy reclassified marijuana from a Schedule I drug to a Schedule II drug. According to a press release from the board, "The Board of Pharmacy's action to reschedule marijuana on the state list does not supersede federal law or create a direct conflict with federal law. It simply does not address federal law," and, "Marijuana or products containing any amount of marijuana will not be available by prescription in Oregon unless they have been approved by the FDA." News reports noted that this reclassification makes Oregon the "first state in the nation to make marijuana anything less serious than a Schedule I drug." (See also Removal of cannabis from Schedule I of the Controlled Substances Act)

A ballot measure of the November 2010 election would have established a state licensing system for marijuana producers and dispensaries, allowed the sale of marijuana from the dispensaries to medical marijuana patients, provide low income assistance for those patients, and set up a research program to evaluate the effects of the new law. It was defeated with 43.85% support and 56.15% opposition. However, the state legislature legalized medical dispensaries a few years later during its 2013 legislative session.

==== Recreational use ====
The Oregon Cannabis Tax Act qualified for the November 2012 state ballot, with the petition having 88,887 valid signatures. If approved, it would have legalized marijuana for recreational adult use, regulated and taxed the cultivation and sale of marijuana, and legalized the production, use, and sale of hemp. It appeared as Measure 80 on the ballot, but was defeated by a margin of approximately 53%-47%.

Results by county of Ballot Measure 91; green counties voted yes and red counties voted no.

Measure 91 was approved in 2014, legalizing non-medical cultivation and uses of marijuana in Oregon starting July 1, 2015. Measure 91's success legitimized the marijuana reform movement and added to the momentum built from Initiative 502 in Washington and Amendment 64 in Colorado, which passed in 2012. While polls in late 2013 showed high support for Measure 91, support waned as the media raised concerns over the practicality of recreational cannabis. This lead the Drug Policy Alliance to spend more money on raising public opinion of Measure 91. Ethan Nadelmann, Drug Policy Alliance Executive Director, said in a 2015 talk, "If I hadn't raised over $2 million last year for Oregon, a tiny fraction of it from people in Oregon, [Measure 91] would have lost. I think it would have lost. You know, these things don't legalize themselves, and it takes real money from people not just in the state and not just in the industry."

In September 2014, some of the municipalities revealed intention to apply sales tax on recreational use, ahead of it being legalized. Measure 91 only allows the state to tax marijuana, so local governments are hoping they'll be able to get their taxes grandfathered in if they pass them now.

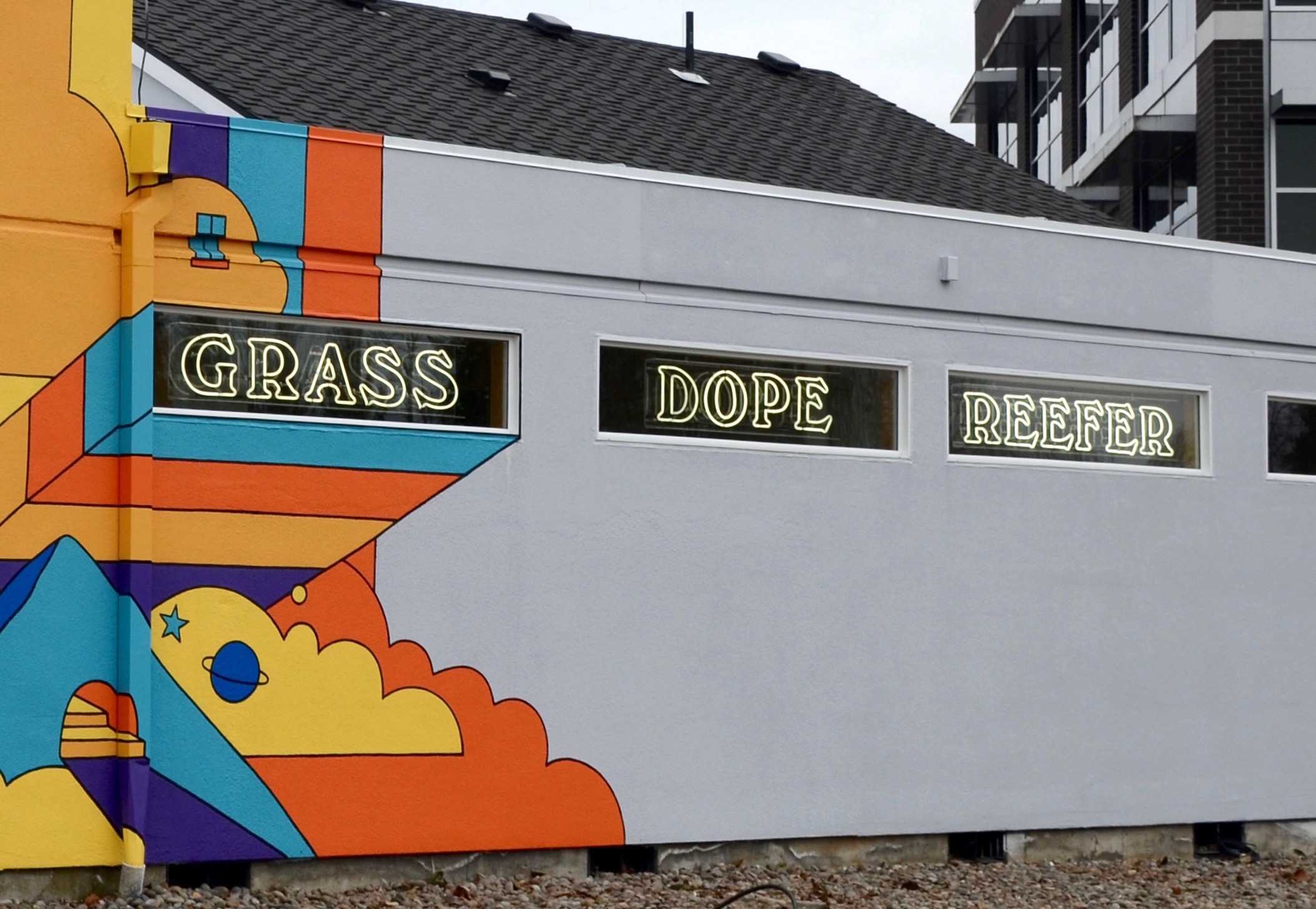
A cannabis shop in a suburb of Portland in 2017

In 2015, Oregon Governor Kate Brown signed an emergency bill declaring marijuana sales legal to recreational users from dispensaries starting October 1, 2015, during an "early sales" period, through the end of 2016. Additional legislation signed into law by Governor Brown in March 2016 allowed the sale of medical and recreational marijuana from the same outlets. Effective January 1, 2017, marijuana can be sold for recreational use only by businesses that have obtained a "recreational license" from the OLCC; such businesses can also sell for medical use. Medical marijuana dispensaries that had not obtained a recreational license were no longer permitted to sell for recreational use after 2016. In mid-December 2016, there were fewer than 100 Oregon businesses licensed to sell recreational marijuana, whereas there were more than 300 medical-marijuana dispensaries (down from a peak of 425). However, the number of applications for recreational licenses jumped sharply in the last months of 2016, and the number of licensed retailers grew from 99 to 260 in the one-month span from early December 2016 to early January 2017.

According to the Oregon Department of Revenue, state and local recreational marijuana sales/excise taxes generated $78 million in tax revenue in 2017, up from $60 million in 2016. A 2019 audit of the City of Portland's distribution of its citywide 3% marijuana tax revenue found that "most of the collected taxes have gone toward shortages in the city’s general fund and specifically to police and transportation programs."

Tax revenue of $3.6 million in the 2018 fiscal year and $4.6 million in 2019 primarily went toward public safety. Small business/prohibition effects received only 16% of the revenue and drug and alcohol programs received 5%." Further, "cannabis business owners and community members have not been involved in budget decisions and the city has not reported on how it has used those tax revenues, according to the audit."

=== Conflict with federal drug law ===
Legality of cannabis in the United States Legal for recreational use Legal for medical use No comprehensive medical program ● Decriminalized Notes: · Reflects laws of states and territories, including laws which have not yet gone into effect. Does not reflect federal, tribal, or local laws. · Map does not show state legality of hemp-derived cannabinoids such as CBD or delta-8-THC, which have been legal at federal level since enactment of the 2018 Farm Bill.

==== Physician liability ====
Physicians cannot have their licenses revoked for recommending or supporting marijuana according to a September 7, 2000 decision by the U.S. District Court. The case, Dr. Marcus Conant, et al., v. McCaffrey et al., arose from two events: the November 1996 passage of California Proposition 215 which authorized medical marijuana, and a December 30, 1996 response to the law by the director of the Office of National Drug Control Policy which said:

A practitioner's action of recommending or prescribing Schedule I controlled substances is not consistent with the 'public interest' (as that phrase is used in the federal Controlled Substances Act) and will lead to administrative action by the Drug Enforcement Administration to revoke the practitioner's registration.

The statement accompanied authorization for the U.S. Inspector General for Health and Human Services to exclude individuals from participation in Medicare and Medicaid programs, such as physicians who recommend marijuana to patients for medical purposes. Clarification two months later affirmed that mere discussion of any drugs with a patient was not grounds for sanction, but affirmed that physicians "may not intentionally provide their patients with oral or written statements in order to enable them to obtain controlled substances in violation of federal law." The court's decision acknowledged that the government has a legitimate concern that physicians might recommend marijuana in bad faith. However, physicians in good faith using honest medical judgment should not fear DEA sanctions. Furthermore,

Given the doctrine of constitutional doubt, the government's construction of the Controlled Substances Act cannot stand. The government should be permanently enjoined from (i) revoking any physician class member's DEA registration merely because the doctor makes a recommendation for the use of medical marijuana based on a sincere medical judgment and (ii) from initiating any investigation solely on that ground. The injunction should apply whether or not the doctor anticipates that the patient will, in turn, use his or her recommendation to obtain marijuana in violation of federal law.

The government appealed the decision to the Ninth Circuit Court of Appeals, which agreed with the lower court on October 29, 2002, and expanded the grounds for the injunction to include free speech. The government appealed again to the Supreme Court which declined to hear it October 14, 2003, reaffirming the California Circuit Court's injunction.

==== Law enforcement ====
In November 2007, a California appeals court ruled that "it is not the job of the local police to enforce the federal drug laws." The U.S. Supreme Court denied an appeal by the city of Garden Grove in December 2008, upholding the decision. The case began in June 2005 with a medical marijuana patient from Garden Grove being pulled over by city police and cited for possession of marijuana, despite his immediate display of proper medical marijuana documentation. The charge against him was later dismissed, but the city refused to return his confiscated eight grams of marijuana, even after being instructed by Orange County Superior Court. The Supreme Court ruling affects 13 U.S. states with medical marijuana laws.

Police departments throughout Oregon decline to press charges, or charges have been dropped for possessing and growing marijuana, even for convicted drug dealers. Salem police estimated they received 30 or 40 calls for marijuana activity in 2007 which were not pursued because the grow operations were legal, even one next to a high school. One grower, a previously convicted felon, was found with evidence of making hash oil, which is not protected, though a grand jury did not indict him.

=== Thermal imaging searches ===
After a federal agent from the Department of the Interior used a thermal imaging device to determine that Danny Lee Kyllo was using grow lamps to grow marijuana in his Florence, Oregon home, the Supreme Court of the United States determined that the use of a thermal imaging device from a public vantage point to monitor the radiation of heat from a person's home was a "search" within the meaning of the Fourth Amendment, and thus required a warrant. Because the police in this case did not have a warrant, the Court reversed Kyllo's conviction for growing marijuana.

=== Interstate commerce ===
Since May 2023, along the whole west coast of the United States (namely California, Oregon and Washington State) has implemented "interstate commerce" of cannabis and marijuana protection legislation.

== See also ==
- Alcoholic beverages in Oregon
- Cannabis in the United States
- Drug policy of Oregon
- History of Oregon
- Legal history of cannabis in the United States
- Politics of Oregon
