= The Hemp and Cannabis Foundation =

Medical Use Marijuana Clinics Operator

- Abbreviation: THCF
- Formation: 1999
- Founder: Paul Stanford
- Founded at: Portland, Oregon
- Type: Non-profit
- Legal status: Active (ownership disputed/under Empower Clinics)
- Purpose: Medical cannabis advocacy and patient services
- Headquarters: Portland, Oregon
- Region served: United States
- Services: Medical marijuana permits, patient education
- Founder: Paul Stanford
- Publication: Hemp News
- Website: www.thcf.org

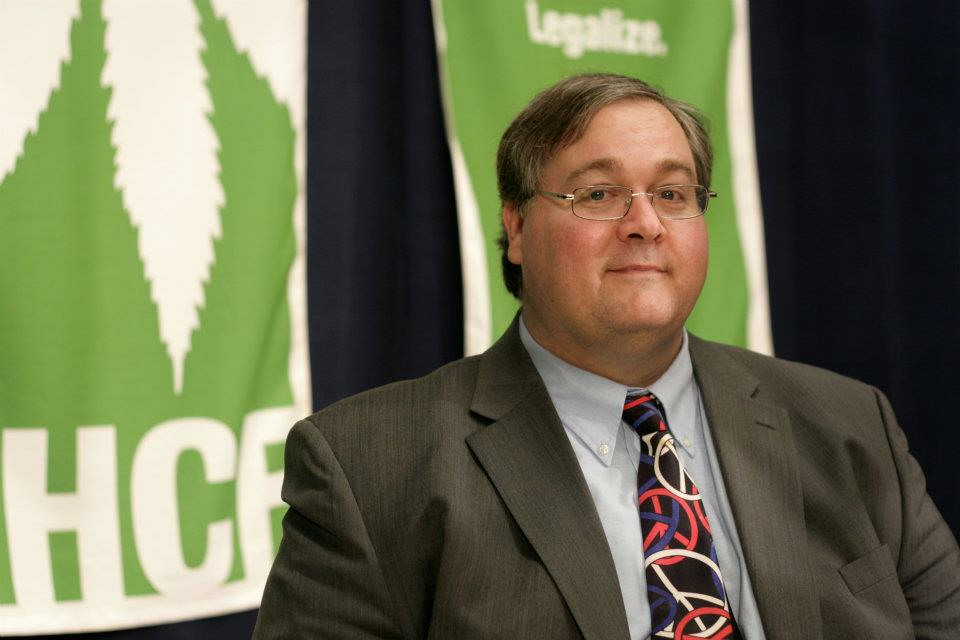
Paul Stanford

The Hemp and Cannabis Foundation (THCF) was founded in 1999 by Paul Stanford in Portland, Oregon. To date, THCF has helped over 250,000 patients obtain a legal permit to use medical marijuana in the states where it is legal and where THCF has clinics. THCF is the largest chain of medical marijuana clinics in the U.S. with clinics operating in 12 states.

== History ==
THCF has produced over 800 episodes of live TV programs of the Cannabis Common Sense TV show. THCF is also the main sponsor of Hempstalk in Portland, Oregon which is celebrating its 11th anniversary as a yearly free festival dedicated to promoting hemp and cannabis.

In 1991, THCF started publishing an online newspaper called Hemp News, which is the oldest online publication still published today. Hemp News is also printed in Spanish.

THCF, along with The Campaign for the Restoration and Regulation of Hemp (CRRH), was responsible for placing Oregon's Measure 80 to legalize hemp and cannabis on the ballot in 2012. Ballot Measure 80 received 47% of the Oregon vote in November 2012.

In 2012, THCF helped Willie Nelson obtain his Oregon medical marijuana permit. THCF also helped other members of Nelson's entourage obtain their Oregon medical marijuana permits. It was during this same visit with Nelson that Paul Stanford asked the singer to publicly support a proposed initiative to legalize marijuana in Oregon that was being sponsored by THCF. Nelson appeared in a 30-second public service announcement in support of the Oregon Cannabis Tax Act ballot initiative.

== Business ==
Since the year 1999, THCF has opened medical clinics in 12 states. 250,000 patients have gone through THCF's clinics to get their permits to use medical marijuana. THCF also has medical marijuana gardens in Oregon and Washington where marijuana production is legal, and the medicine from these gardens have won many awards at yearly Cannabis Cup events. THCF is one of the nation's largest and longest-running cannabis recommendation clinics.

== Activism ==
On May 24, 2007 the DEA along with the Federal Government and federal prosecutor James Hagerty filed a subpoena for the medical records of 17 individuals, 14 of which were patients who had received medical marijuana permits from a THCF clinic. Eleven of the patients who were named in the subpoena were legally registered patients with the State of Oregon's Department of Human Services medical marijuana program. The subpoena demanded that the State of Oregon turn over the THCF patients’ private medical records to the government. Eventually a federal judge sided with THCF and the State of Oregon and granted a motion to quash both subpoenas. "Absent a further showing of necessity and relevance, compliance with the subpoena would impact significant State and medical privacy interests and is unreasonable," wrote Judge Robert H. Whaley of the U.S. Court Eastern District of Washington.
