= Alcoholic beverages in Oregon =

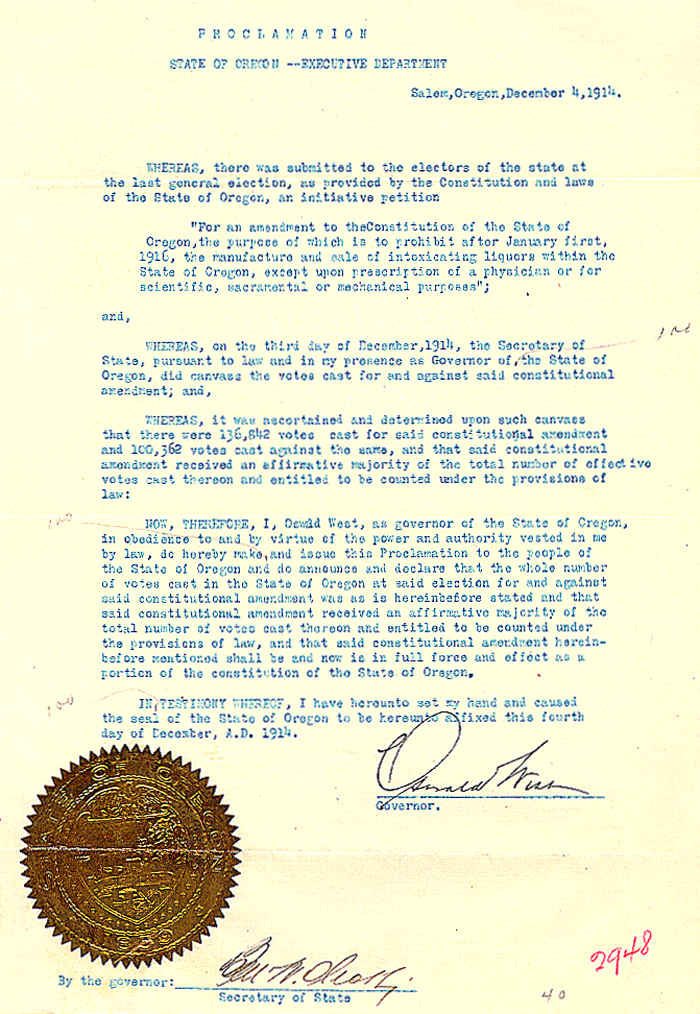
1914 Executive Order by Governor Oswald West, announcing the passage of prohibition by ballot initiative

The U.S. state of Oregon has an extensive history of laws regulating the sale and consumption of alcoholic beverages, dating back to 1844. It has been an alcoholic beverage control state, with the Oregon Liquor and Cannabis Commission holding a monopoly over the sale of all distilled beverages, since Prohibition. Today, there are thriving industries producing beer, wine, and liquor in the state. Alcohol may be purchased between 7 a.m. and 2:30 a.m for consumption at the premise it was sold at, or between 6 a.m. and 2:30 a.m. if it is bought and taken off premise. In 2020, Oregon began allowing the sale of alcohol via home delivery services. As of 2007, consumption of spirits was on the rise while beer consumption held steady. That same year, 11% of beer sold in Oregon was brewed in-state, the highest figure in the United States.

Oregon wine production began in the mid-19th century, before it was a state. By 1919, the industry had collapsed due to prohibition, and after prohibition ended fruit wines dominated the industry. The modern era of Oregon wine began in 1961, and the industry cemented its reputation in 1975 by winning a French award. In 2007, wine making was a $207.8 million business. Beer production began in 1852 with Henry Saxer's liberty brewing in Portland. In 1862 Henry Weinhard's bought the Liberty brewery. The company is now a part of the Miller Brewing Company, but it helped Portland to become the microbrewing capital of the world. Portland hosts North America's largest beerfest, and Oregon has produced a number of national and international award winning beers.

In 1844, the Oregon territories voted to prohibit alcoholic beverages. This was repealed in 1845, but prohibition was reinstated in 1915, four years before the national alcohol prohibition. When national prohibition was repealed in 1933, the Oregon Liquor Control Commission (OLCC) was created. The agency changed its name in 2021 to the Oregon Liquor and Cannabis Commission. Unlike states that allow liquor sales in grocery stores, liquor in Oregon is sold only in OLCC run liquor stores and establishments that have liquor licenses, and the OLCC has strict guidelines and training to ensure that all licensed venues understand how to safely sell and serve alcoholic beverages. Alcohol and alcoholism are also studied by the state at the Portland Alcohol Research Center.

== Consumption ==
Alcohol laws in Oregon permit the sale of beer, wine, and liquor, for on- or off-premises consumption, between 07:00 a.m. and 02:30 a.m. In 2004, Oregonians consumed 5,103,000 US gallons (19,320,000 L) of distilled spirits, 11,132,000 US gallons (42,140,000 L) of wine, and 80,415,000 US gallons (304,400,000 L) of beer, ranking it 27th, 19th, and 27th respectively of US states. Oregon had an estimated population of 3,594,586 in 2004, ranking it 27th among US states.

In 2007, sales of spirits increased 9% over the previous year. Whiskey and vodka were the top sellers, while tequila had the largest percentage increase. Oregonians' top buy was Jack Daniel's, with 412,000 bottles sold. This was during a national spirits trend where manufacturers introduced new products and advertising aimed at young drinkers. Again in 2007, Oregon's 2.6 million adults on average drank 32 gallons of beer each, versus 4 gallons of wine and 2 gallons of spirits, but sales of beer hadn't increased like sales of spirits. The Oregon Department of Human Services reported that while drinking among 8th–11th graders has fallen nationally, it has increased in Oregon. The number of DUI offenses dropped between 2002 and 2005, from 25,342 to 23,455.

=== Beer consumption ===
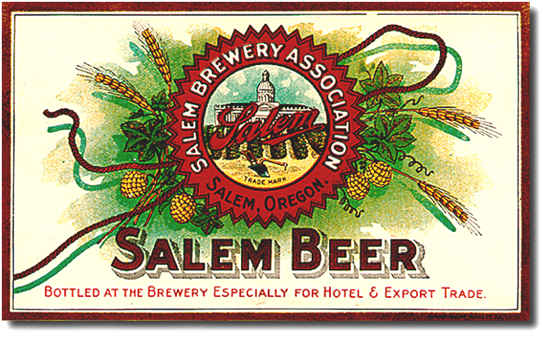
Salem Beer label from 1904

The following table lists the amount of beer consumed in Oregon for the years 1997–2004 as reported in the 2005 Beer Handbook. The scale is in 1,000s of cases of beer. A case of beer is 24 12-ounce beers, for a total of 2.25 gallons per case.

Year	Oregon	United States
1997	31,822	2,632,184
1998	32,242	2,667,752
1999	32,947	2,727,195
2000	33,398	2,765,670
2001	34,400	2,788,820
2002	34,650	2,824,710
2003	35,000	2,817,400
2004	35,740	2,838,400

== Production ==
=== Wine ===
Wine grapes were planted in Oregon in the Willamette Valley starting in 1847. A census in 1860 revealed that Oregon's wine production was 2,600 gallons. In the 1880s and 1890s, German immigrants began planting wine grapes in Southern Oregon. In the 1880s, Ernest Reuter garnered a reputation for his Klevner wines, grown in the Willamette Valley, west of Forest Grove. By 1919, the Oregon wine industry had collapsed due to the temperance movement and resulting prohibition. Fruit wines dominated Oregon's wine industry post-prohibition, and by 1938 there were 28 bonded wineries, producing wines based on berries, Concord grapes, and other American hybrids.

Oregon's modern wine industry dates to 1961 when Hillcrest Vineyard in Roseburg began planting Riesling and small amounts of other grapes. In 1965, Oregon pinot noir was established when The Eyrie Vineyards planted grapes near Corvallis. Oregon's wine reputation was made in 1979 when a French magazine ranked The Eyrie's 1975 Pinot noir third among 330 wines of the world. By 2007, Oregon wineries were producing 1.7 million cases of wine for a total of $207.8 million in sales.

There are several official American Viticultural Areas entirely within the state, including the Willamette Valley, Southern Oregon, Umpqua Valley, and Rogue Valley AVAs. Parts of the Columbia Gorge, Walla Walla Valley, and Snake River Valley AVAs lie within Oregon. Pinot noir and Pinot gris are the top two grapes grown.

=== Beer ===
In 1862, German immigrant Henry Weinhard founded a brewery in Portland. By the early 1880s it had become the Northwest's largest brewery. Weinhard once attempted to pump free beer through Portland's Skidmore Fountain. He died in 1904, but the company continued to do well, making it through prohibition by brewing soft drinks and merging with Arnold Blitz, a local competitor. Blitz-Weinhard was sold to the Pabst Brewing Company in 1979, and then again to the Miller Brewing Company in 1999. The company helped prepare Oregon beer drinkers for the arrival of microbrewing.

Portland, Oregon is considered to be the nation's microbrew capital. A microbrewery is defined as one that produces less than 15,000 barrels a year. Portland hosts the Oregon Brewers Festival, North America's largest beer festival. The microbrewery industry began in 1979 when President Jimmy Carter legalized home brewing. In 2006, 14 beers from eight Oregon breweries won medals at the Great American Beer Festival, out of 2,800 entries. Also in 2006, Oregon won 11 times at the World Beer Cup, in a field of 2,200 beers. In 2007, 11% of beer sold in Oregon was brewed in-state, the highest figure in the United States. According to the Oregon Hop Commission, in 2007, Oregon was also the second largest U.S. hops producer, after Washington.

=== Spirits ===
As of 2008, Oregon contains 12 of the nation's 142 craft distilleries, up from six in 2006. In 2007, a law was approved allowing tasting rooms and direct sales to the public. Jim Dodge, purchasing manager for the OLCC, believes that the distilleries are an outgrowth of the microbrew industry, instead of the wine industry, as well as a societal change. Dodge explained that "there's been a recent shift from beer, and to some degree wine, to distilled spirits as the alcohol of choice."

In 2008, the U.S. Food and Drug Administration determined that absinthe was legal, though it had been understood to be illegal for about 80 years. Portland distillery Integrity Spirits responded by releasing the second American-made absinthe, which was in high demand immediately upon its release.

== Legislative history ==
Oregon has been regulating alcohol through its laws for over 150 years. In 1844, the Oregon Territory voted to prohibit alcoholic beverages. This is often referred to as the first prohibition in the United States. The law was repealed in 1845. From 1845 to 1915, various local laws governing alcohol were passed: in 1908, Portland Councilman George Cellars restricted establishments that could serve alcohol to restaurants greater than 400 square feet (37 m^{2}) and when a meal was ordered, which caused saloons to simply change their name. Councilman Rushlight amended it to 300 square feet (28 m^{2}) and required a food purchase but not a full meal, but this was vetoed by Mayor Harry Lane.

=== Prohibition ===
Using Oregon's local initiative system, the Anti-Saloon League helped focus the movement into passing the Local Option Act by initiative in 1904, allowing individual cities to go dry. Hood River, Oregon became the first dry city in 1905. The ASL and other temperance organizations spent years organizing, and finally passed Initiative 334 in 1914. This initiative required the state legislature to pass prohibition laws, which they did in 1915, preceding national alcohol prohibition by four years.

Accompanying legislation banning liquor advertising in the state resulted in at least some out-of-state newspapers cancelling subscriptions in Oregon.

Liquor was imported into Oregon on the Southern Pacific Railroad from other West Coast states. The smuggling ring was led by the Pullman porters and supplied smuggled liquor to Portland through the 1950s.

In 1933, national prohibition ended with a repeal of the Eighteenth Amendment to the United States Constitution. Oregon's governor, Julius Meier, appointed Dr. William S. Knox to study the situation. Knox recommended adopting the Canadian system of sales of alcohol by the state. The reasoning was that this would provide revenue and lower alcohol abuse.

The Oregon Legislative Assembly held a special session and the OLCC was created days after the repeal of national prohibition. Eighteen states in total chose to regulate alcohol. Oregon Revised Statutes Chapters 471, 472, 473 and 474 were the commission's enabling statutes. OAR Chapter 845 governed its administrative rules. The OLCC's mission is "to effectively regulate the sale, distribution, and responsible use of alcoholic beverages in order to protect Oregon's public health, safety and community livability." However, under these laws bootlegging in Oregon was rife and Portland became infamous as a center of corruption.

=== Post-Prohibition licensing ===
In 1939, the advertising of hard liquor on billboards and in newspapers was voluntarily discontinued. Also, in 1939, a "club bill" was passed by the Legislative Assembly. The bill gave regulatory power to the OLCC over hotels, restaurants and private clubs where liquor was served. Lobbyists then succeeded in having the bill referred to the voters in 1940. Voters passed the bill in 1940.

In 1944, the "Burke Bill" became law: wines with more than 14% alcohol could only be sold by Commission stores and agencies. Also in the 1940s, a "service bars" license was established. This restricted liquor licenses to establishments serving food. In 1949, the Legislative Assembly approved a method where establishments that sold liquor could ask for proof of age from patrons they thought were under the age of 21. Measure 15—passed in 1952—amended the Constitution (Article I, section 39) to regulate the sale of liquor by the individual glass.

Five more types of licenses were created in the 1950s, dealing with liquor-by-the-drink operations, industry agents, salesmen, out-of-state manufacturers of malt beverages, and conventions, group meetings, etc. In 1960, establishments were required to have food sales equal to 25% of their total sales. In the 1970s, the OLCC began enforcing the Oregon Bottle Bill and wines of up to 20% alcohol became allowed with certain licenses. In the 1980s, the number of OLCC commissioners was changed from three to five, to reflect the number of congressional districts. The 1990s saw a flurry of laws passed governing the OLCC's oversight of the newly numerous Oregon wineries and microbreweries. House Bill 4028–passed in 2002–allowed liquor stores to operate on Sunday; they had previously been restricted to six days a week.

=== Ballot measures relating to alcohol ===
The following ballot measures changed state policy on alcohol:

- Measure 3 (1904), a "local option" law, passed.
- Measure 17 (1914), Prohibition Constitutional Amendment: passed 57.7%
- Measure 9 (1916), Prohibition Amendment Forbidding Importation of Intoxicating Liquors for Beverage Purposes: passed with 51.2%.
- Measure 7 (1932), Bill to Repeal State Prohibition Law of Oregon: passed 59.8%
- Measure 7 (1944), Burke Bill; Only State Selling Liquor over 14 Hundredths Alcohol: passed 55.95%
- Measure 15 (1952), Constitutional Amendment Authorizing Alcoholic Liquor Sale by Individual Glass: passed 56.4%

The following alcohol-related ballot measures have failed:

- Measure 3 (1906), Amendment to local option law giving anti-prohibitionists and prohibitionists equal privileges: failed with 43.9% support.
- Measure 22 (1910), Prohibiting Liquor Traffic: failed 41.6%.
- Measure 23 (1910), Prohibiting the Sale of Liquors and Regulating Shipments of Same, and Providing for Search for Liquor: failed 40.2%.
- Measure 8 (1916), Permitting Manufacture and Regulating Sale 4 Percent Malt Liquors: failed with 38% support.
- Measure 11 (1938), Bill Regulating Sale of Alcoholic Liquor for Beverage Purposes: failed 34.7%
- Measure 6 (1940), Bill to Further Regulate Sale and Use of Alcoholic Liquor: failed 40.2%
- Measure 9 (1950), Making Sale of Promotively Advertised Alcoholic Beverage Unlawful: failed 23.1%
- Measure 5 (1988), Finances Intercollegiate Athletic Fund by Increasing Malt Beverage, Cigarette Taxes

== Research ==
The Portland Alcohol Research Center is a NIH-established effort funded by the National Institute on Alcohol Abuse and Alcoholism. About 20 scientists and 60 people, mostly at OHSU, are investigating science organized around ten components:

- Dependency using mice.
- Molecular genetics responses affecting alcohol withdrawal and preference.
- Quantitative trait locus which relates gene expression to genotypes.
- Genetic analysis of gene expression.
- Characterization of ethanol response on chromosome 11.
- Massive search strategy for ethanol-related genes.
- Genetic models of variation in impulsivity and alcoholism.
- Genetics of alcohol-associated traits in monkeys.
- A dedicated section (Pilot projects) launches 2 to 4 projects annually.
- Educational outreach with three aims: K-12 schools, scientific education, and publication.

Additional themes and focuses include:

- Genetic contributions to alcohol sensitivity
- Permit is needed to make Alcohol.
- Behavioral predispositions to the drug, such as impulse effects and dependency.

The center has trained medical students in alcohol-related issues for more than 30 years and has published more than 380 papers and articles since 1996.

== See also ==
- Alcohol laws of the United States by state
- Drug policy of Oregon
- Cannabis in Oregon
- Fern Hobbs, West's personal secretary
- Oregon Bottle Bill
- Oswald West, former Governor and noted prohibitionist
- Woman's Christian Temperance Union
