= Oregon Liquor and Cannabis Commission =

Government agency controlling sale of alcohol in Oregon

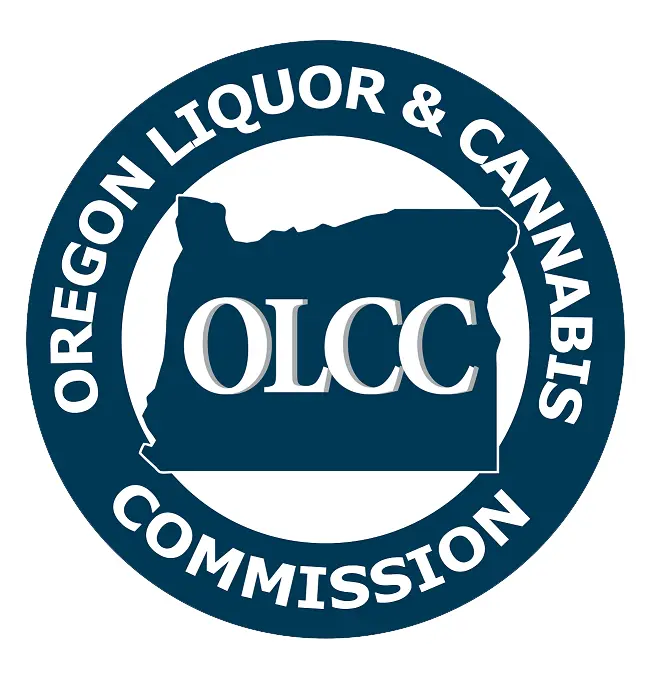

Agency overview
- Formed: 1933
- Jurisdiction: Oregon, U.S.
- Headquarters: Milwaukie, Oregon
- Website: oregon.gov/OLCC

The Oregon Liquor and Cannabis Commission (OLCC), formerly known as the Oregon Liquor Control Commission, is a government agency of the U.S. state of Oregon. The OLCC was created by an act of the Oregon Legislative Assembly in 1933, days after the repeal of prohibition, as a means of providing control over the distribution, sales and consumption of alcoholic beverages. To this end, the agency was given the authority to regulate and license those who manufacture, sell or serve alcohol.

Oregon is one of 17 alcoholic beverage control states that directly control the sales of alcoholic beverages in the United States. The commission has also been put in charge of enforcing the Oregon Bottle Bill when it was passed in 1971. The passage of 2014 Oregon Ballot Measure 91 legalized the recreational use of marijuana in Oregon and gave regulatory authority to the OLCC.

OLCC has been criticized for having a "clubby" organizational culture. In 2023, it was reported that OLCC had been, for more than eight years, setting aside and diverting rare liquor that came through the system into the hands of higher managers and legislators.

== History ==
Alcohol Prohibition in the United States began in 1919 with the passing of the Eighteenth Amendment. In the early 1930s, Oregon Governor Julius Meier appointed a committee, led by Dr. William S. Knox, to study Oregon's options regarding the regulation of alcoholic beverages in the state. In what came to be known as the Knox Report, the committee recommended a system similar to Canada's.

Based on the recommendations in the Knox Report, the Oregon Legislative Assembly held a special session that created the Oregon Liquor Control Commission in 1933, just days after the national repeal of prohibition. Governor Meier signed the Liquor Control Act (also known as the Knox Act) on December 15, 1933. The act gave the state exclusive rights to sell distilled spirits and fortified wine as well as the authority to license private businesses to sell beer and wine by the bottle or glass.

Marijuana Prohibition in the State of Oregon began in 1935 with the passage of the Uniform State Narcotic Drug Act. Possession of small amounts of marijuana was decriminalized in Oregon in 1973. In 1998, the state passed the Oregon Medical Marijuana Act, allowing residents to obtain a Medical Marijuana Patient card and grow or obtain marijuana for personal use for medical purposes. Under that act, patients are allowed to designate caregivers, which allowed for the growth of the Oregon medical marijuana dispensary program. The passage of Measure 91 in 2014 legalized possession of marijuana for recreational personal use and created a regulatory licensing and enforcement structure for commercial sales of marijuana. This bill also legalized the growing of personal marijuana plants at a household, which was unique among the three states which had legalized marijuana at the time (Oregon, Washington, and Colorado.) In 2015, Oregon State Governor Kate Brown signed an emergency bill allowing medical marijuana dispensaries to sell small amounts of marijuana to recreational customers in order provide a legal source of marijuana for recreational purposes while additional statutes and administrative rules were put into place for the recreational marijuana program. This "Early Retail Sales" bill allowed these sales to continue until December 31, 2016. After that time, medical dispensaries were no longer allowed to sell to recreational customers.

Theft of liquor from OLCC liquor stores have increased 450% between 2018 and 2022.

== Divisions ==
Regulatory Operations issues liquor and marijuana licenses, alcohol service permits, and marijuana worker permits. Licenses are required for anyone who manufactures, distributes or sells alcoholic beverages or marijuana in Oregon. Service permits are issued to employees who serve alcohol in restaurants, bars, or other businesses. Marijuana worker permits are issued to marijuana business employees who handle, interact with, track, or secure marijuana items and any person who supervises those activities. Regulatory Operations also promotes compliance with marijuana and liquor laws through education and proactive programs for licensees and permittees. This program also focuses on enforcement efforts geared toward reducing underage drinking and use of marijuana.

Merchandising Operations has three divisions: Purchasing, Distribution, and Store Operations. The Merchandising Program operates the state's retail liquor business, including supplying the 244 (as of September 2010) retail liquor stores. Oregon has been partially privatized since the 1980s. Oregon retail liquor stores are privately owned by independent small business contractors. The OLCC contracts with the independent business owners to sell Oregonians the distilled beverages they want, while operating a business that is one of the top revenue producers for the state. In fiscal year 2010, the OLCC contributed nearly $172 million to Oregon's general fund, county and city treasuries from the sales of distilled spirits, taxes on beer and wine and other revenue.

Support Services consists of three divisions: Administration, Administrative Services, and Financial Services. The program provides support and administrative services for OLCC staff and numerous partners.

== Board ==
A seven-member board of commissioners meets monthly to set OLCC policy and make decisions in areas such as liquor licenses, rules, contested case hearings and appointments of liquor store agents. The governor appoints and the Senate confirms these commissioners for four-year terms. Each commissioner represents a congressional district. A minimum of one seat on the Commission is must be reserved for a representative of the restaurant and hospitality industry. Commissioners receive no pay for their time and work except for reimbursement of travel fees.

== Enforcement authority ==
ORS 471.775 Regulatory specialists have authority as provided under this chapter, ORS chapter 153, ORS 133.005 to 133.400, 133.450, 133.525 to 133.703, 133.721 to 133.739, 161.235, 161.239 and 161.245 and chapter 743, Oregon Laws 1971, to conduct inspections or investigations, make arrests and seizures, aid in prosecutions for offenses, issue criminal citations and citations for violations and otherwise enforce this chapter, ORS 474.005 to 474.095 and 474.115, commission rules and any other laws of this state that the commission considers related to alcoholic liquor, including but not limited to laws regarding the manufacture, importation, transportation, possession, distribution, sale or consumption of alcoholic beverages, the manufacture or use of false identification or the entry of premises licensed to sell alcoholic liquor.

ORS 475B.285 An Oregon Liquor Control Commission regulatory specialist has the authority as provided in ORS 133.005 to 133.400, 133.450, 133.525 to 133.703, 133.721 to 133.739, 161.235, 161.245 and 475B.010 to 475B.395, ORS chapter 153 and chapter 743, Oregon Laws 1971, to conduct inspections and investigations, make seizures, aid in prosecutions for offenses, issue citations for violations and otherwise enforce the provisions of ORS 475B.010 to 475B.395, any rule adopted under ORS 475B.010 to 475B.395 and any other law of this state that charges the commission with a duty, function or power related to marijuana, including enforcing any provision of a law or rule related to individuals who use false identification for purposes of purchasing or possessing a marijuana item or who engage in illegal activity on or near a licensed premises.

Under state statute, the regulatory specialists (inspectors) of the OLCC whether enforcing marijuana or liquor regulations, are considered peace officers when exercising authority over liquor or marijuana related activities and business. This classification includes police officers and officers of the state's Criminal Justice Division. Although this classification and the statutory authority provide OLCC regulatory specialists broad law enforcement authority including the authority to use force, make arrests, issue citations, and seize property, regulatory specialists are prohibited by OLCC Policy from carrying firearms while exercising that authority.

== Programs and administration ==
Today, Oregon's alcohol regulation program has three major operational programs; the Distilled Spirits Program, the Recreational Marijuana Program, and the Public Safety Program. All three programs are supported by the Administration, Financial Services, and Support Services divisions.

The Distilled Spirits Program oversees the distribution and sale of distilled spirits in the state. The Distilled Spirits division centrally purchases, warehouses and distributes distilled spirits to Oregon's independently operated liquor stores. OLCC's Public Safety Program licenses and regulates businesses in the alcohol industry such as manufacturers, wholesalers, bars, restaurants, grocery and convenience stores.

The Recreational Marijuana Program is exclusively authorized to make recreational marijuana available to consumers and licensed businesses through retail marijuana stores. The program also tracks the growing, transporting, processing and selling of recreational marijuana products.

The Public Safety Program is responsible for licensing and regulating the operation of the liquor and recreational marijuana industry in Oregon.

The OLCC has five regional offices housing aspects of each program.

=== 1971 Oregon Bottle Bill ===
With the passage of the Oregon Bottle Bill in 1971, OLCC has been assigned to administer and enforce the bottle bill, such as retailers refusing to accept containers or selling non-compliant containers. The commission however does not have the authority to enact changes to the Bottle Bill.

=== 2006 director resignation after DUI arrest ===
On April 27, 2006, Teresa Kaiser, the director of the commission at that time, resigned after being charged with driving with a blood alcohol content of 0.16, twice the legal limit in Oregon. The arrest was widely reported in mass media after the incident occurred. Following the arrest and resignation, the OLCC board held an emergency meeting to appoint an interim acting executive director.

=== 2015 Cannabis Advisory Committee and Oregon Measure 91 ===
In 2015, OLCC introduced a 15-member advisory committee tasked with proposing the necessary administrative regulations for the recent recreational marijuana legislation, sanctioned by voters in the previous November. OLCC Executive Director Steven Marks sought representation from various sectors for the Rules Advisory Committee, which oversees the marijuana industry, law enforcement, local government, and the general public. The aims of the committee was to ensure a balanced approach to rule recommendations in line with the voters' intent after passing Measure 9 in 2014. Measure 91:

allows for people that are 21 years of age or older to legally possess up to 1 ounce of marijuana in public, and up to 8 ounces of marijuana plant material in private, or alternatively, up to 72 ounces of liquid marijuana product, or alternatively up to 16 ounces of a solid marijuana product. Additionally, Measure 91 allows for people above the age of 21 to grow marijuana at their home. The law allows for a household to have up to a total of 4 marijuana plants.

Additionally, OLCC established two permanent technical subcommittees: one for advising on licensing, compliance, and law enforcement matters, and another for traceability (from seed to sale) and the testing of recreational marijuana at laboratories accessible to the public.

=== 2023 executive director resignation ===
OLCC's executive director Steve Marks abruptly resigned in February 2023 at the request of governor Tina Kotek. Marks is among those who leveraged their position to preferentially obtain scarce Pappy Van winkle whiskey.

== "Bourbongate" scandal ==
In February 2023, six additional OLCC executives were accused of diverting rare whiskey from state inventories. The accusation of corruption in the ranks of OLCC has led to the resignation of Oregon officials, who regulate alcoholic beverage and legal marijuana sales in Oregon. The governor asked that the commission install new leadership and remove the managers and executive leaders “who have taken advantage of their access and authority to benefit themselves.” A system was in place to give consumers a fair chance to purchase rare liquor, however OLCC connected individuals and politicians circumvented this covertly by availing themselves to "safety stock", a reserve set aside in the event of breakage.

== See also ==
- Alcohol in Oregon
- Alcohol laws of the United States by state
- Alcohol monopoly
- Cannabis in Oregon
- Controlled substances in Oregon
- List of law enforcement agencies in Oregon
- Oregon breweries
- Oregon wine
