= Paul Stanford =

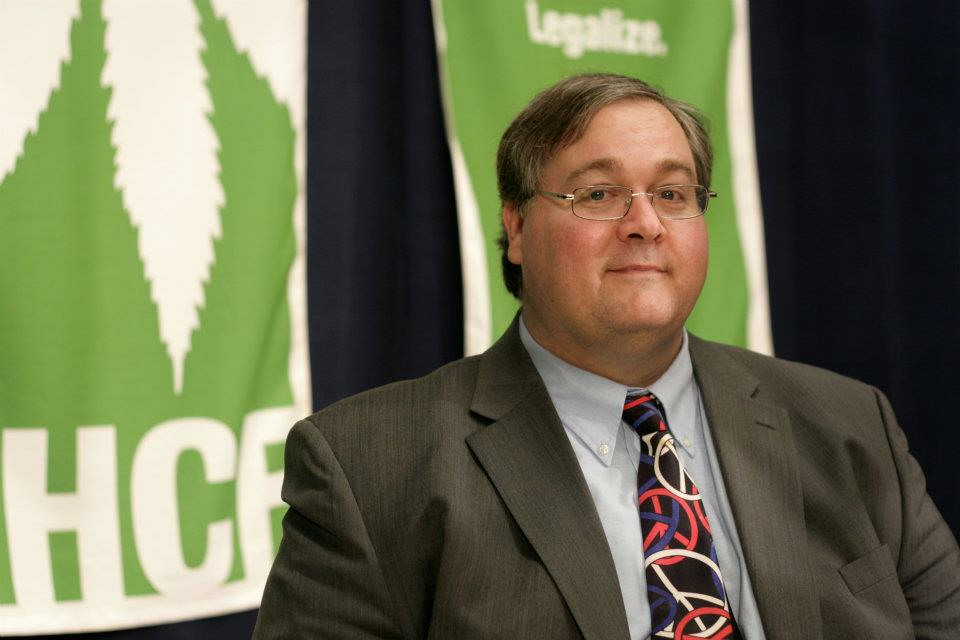
- Occupation: Marijuana activist
- Years active: 1984–March 2023
- Notable work: The Hemp and Cannabis Foundation

Paul Stanford is an American marijuana activist and the founder of The Hemp and Cannabis Foundation (THCF), THCF Medical Clinics, and the Campaign for the Restoration and Regulation of Hemp (CRRH).

Stanford founded the Hemp and Cannabis Foundation in 1999 in Portland, Oregon. The group claimed to have helped over 250,000 patients obtain a legal permit to use medical marijuana in the states where it is legal and where THCF has clinics. THCF was the largest chain of medical marijuana clinics in the U.S., with clinics in 12 states. The clinic has since been sold to outside investors and is now known as Empower Clinics. Stanford maintains the company was stolen and continues to fight in court to regain control.

== Activism ==
Stanford has been active working toward ending marijuana and hemp prohibition since 1984. He first attended a protest for marijuana legalization at the White House in Washington, DC a week after his 18th birthday in 1978. In 1984, he was instrumental in a now-famous Oregon political ballot initiative called the Oregon Marijuana Initiative (OMI), which made the ballot and lost, but became the template for Stanford's later efforts. He helped Jack Herer research and write the first edition of The Emperor Wears No Clothes in 1985.

Stanford has been called as an expert court witness on marijuana and medicinal cannabis issues. He has produced and hosted over 750 episodes of live TV programs for his public access show Cannabis Common Sense. He has also produced and announced radio shows and advertising. Stanford produced the yearly Hempstalk festival in Portland, Oregon, which was last held in 2016.

THCF prints a newspaper, Hemp News, which has also been online since 1991 and is the oldest online publication still operating today. It is also printed in Spanish.

Another one of Stanford's businesses, which was founded over 25 years ago, is the Campaign for the Restoration and Regulation of Hemp (CRRH). Stanford helped draft Oregon Ballot Measure 80, and Stanford and CRRH placed Oregon's Measure 80 to legalize hemp and cannabis on the ballot in 2012, which obtained 47% of the Oregon vote. In 2014 CRRH tried again, but failed to get their initiatives on the ballot. In the end, campaigners were complaining of late paychecks and picketing the campaign office.

== Business ==
In 1988 Stanford started Tree Free Eco Paper, which arranged for the manufacture of hemp paper in China and Europe. He secured initial capital financing and received bank letters of credit for the import and export of shipments of hemp products to and from Asia, Europe and North America. Tree Free Eco Paper imported hemp paper and marketed to businesses and the public via mail order. The business failed, resulting in lawsuits from disgruntled investors.

The Hemp and Cannabis Foundation has opened medical clinics in 12 states. 250,000 patients have gone through THCF's clinics. THCF is one of the nation's largest and longest-running cannabis recommendation clinics.

THCF's medical marijuana gardens in Oregon have won many awards. His stock was deflated and he lost controlling ownership of the company in a hostile takeover. The company is now known as Empower Healthcare.

In 2012, Stanford helped Willie Nelson obtain his Oregon medical marijuana permit. THCF also helped other people associated with Nelson to obtain their Oregon medical marijuana permits.

== Legal issues ==
While attending Portland State University, Stanford was arrested twice for selling marijuana. In 1991, after starting Tree Free Eco Paper, he served a five-month prison term for violating the terms of his probation by traveling outside the country.

In 1999, a judge ordered Stanford to repay $39,000 to Microsoft millionaire Bruce McKinney as part of a failed marijuana legalization campaign in Washington state. In 1999 and 2000, Stanford filed for bankruptcy multiple times, and his house was foreclosed on in 2001.

Stanford has lost several battles with the Internal Revenue Service, including a judgement for $200,000 in 2009. In addition, the State of Oregon has filed more than $33,000 in tax liens against Stanford. In 2011, he pleaded guilty to tax evasion, agreeing to 18 months probation and 160 hours of community service. He claims these legal issues are as a result of persecution for his political beliefs.

== Award-winning marijuana cultivation ==
Stanford has won awards for his medical marijuana, and has given away over 200 kilos of free marijuana a year to sick and dying patients over the last 12 years. Stanford won the top three places at the 2008 Oregon Medical Cannabis Awards. He took first place with his version of a strain known as Lemon Pledge, second with a strain called Train Wreck, and third with Dynamite. Stanford also won an honorable mention for best flavor with Green Lantern.

== Other marijuana-related projects ==
Stanford has an online museum of antique medical cannabis bottles and containers.
