= Kassandra Frederique =

American drug policy advocate (born 1986)

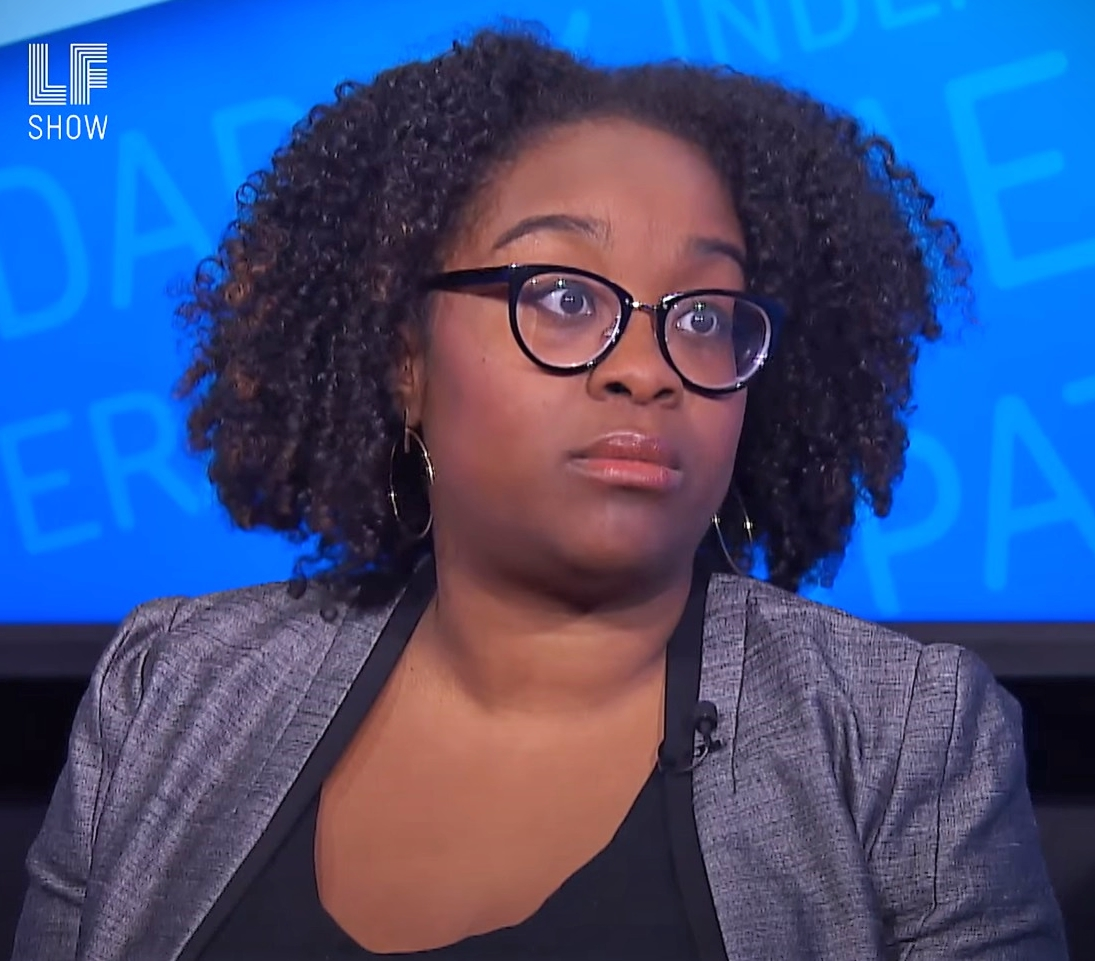
- Frederique on The Laura Flanders Show, 2019

Executive Director of the Drug Policy Alliance
- Incumbent
- Assumed office September 2020
- Preceded by: Maria McFarland Sanchez-Moreno

Personal details
- Born: 1986 (age 39–40) Manhattan, New York
- Occupation: Drug policy advocate; journalist
- Frederique's voice Frederique talks about cannabis reform on The Laura Flanders Show, 2019

Kassandra Frederique (born 1986) is an American drug policy advocate and journalist. Since September 2020, she has served as the president of the Drug Policy Alliance.

== Biography ==
Kassandra Frederique was born in 1986 in Manhattan, New York to Haitian immigrant parents. Frederique worked as the managing director of Policy Advocacy and Campaigns for the Drug Policy Alliance, and in September 2020, she became the executive director, proceeding Maria McFarland Sanchez-Moreno. While executive director, she oversaw the 2020 Oregon Ballot Measure 110, which reclassified drug possession in Oregon.
