= 2014 Oregon Ballot Measure 91 =

Referendum legalizing marijuana

Ballot Measure 91
- Control, Regulation, and Taxation of Marijuana and Industrial Hemp Act of 2014: Legalize recreational marijuana for those aged 21 and above.; Legalize possession of up to eight ounces of marijuana and four plants.; Give the Oregon Liquor Control Commission the ability to regulate marijuana.

Results
Choice	Votes	%
Yes	847,865	56.11%
No	663,346	43.89%
Valid votes	1,511,211	100.00%
Invalid or blank votes	0	0.00%
Total votes	1,511,211	100.00%
Registered voters/turnout	2,178,334	69.37%
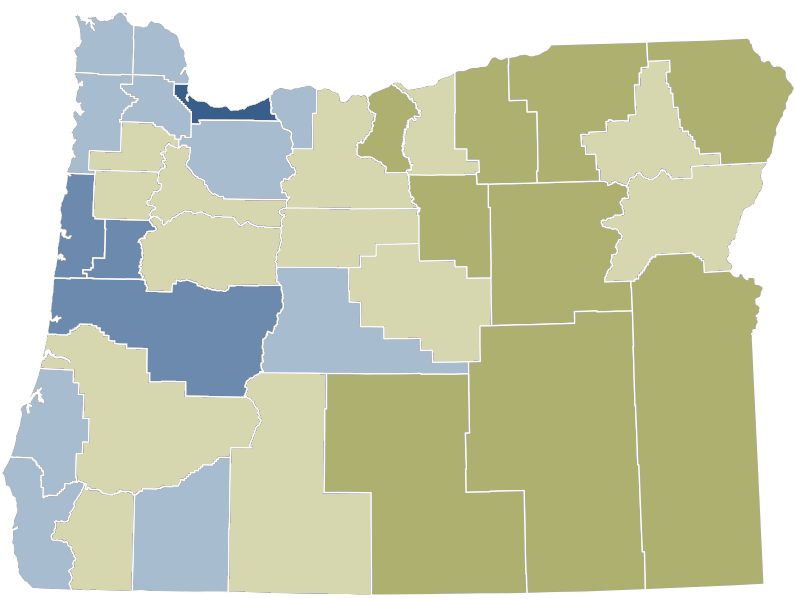
Yes: 50–60% 60–70% 70–80%	No: 50–60% 60–70%

Oregon Ballot Measure 91 was a 2014 ballot measure in the U.S. state of Oregon. Its passage legalized the "recreational use of marijuana, based on regulation and taxation to be determined by the Oregon Liquor Control Commission".

Measure 91 was the third initiative seeking to legalize marijuana for recreational use in Oregon; previous measures were 1986's Measure 5 and 2012's Measure 80 while medical use of marijuana was legalized in Oregon in 1998. Measure 91 passed by approximately 56% to 44%. Most polls leading up to the election showed majority support for legalizing recreational marijuana use among adults.

== Implementation ==
Effective July 1, 2015 (per Section 82(1)) the measure legalizes the possession and use of marijuana for adults 21-years of age or older. Adults can carry up to one ounce of marijuana, keep up to eight ounces at home per household, and grow up to four plants per household.

Retail sales outlets will be licensed by the Oregon Liquor Control Commission, which must begin accepting applications on or before January 4, 2016. Early sales started October 1, 2015 through existing medical marijuana dispensaries. Sales topped $11 million in the first week that recreational marijuana was legally available for sale in Oregon.

== Fiscal impact ==
Estimates project that the initiative would generate between $17 million to $40 million per year in tax revenue. Potential cost savings for the state and local governments were noted though not explicitly identified in monetary terms due to uncertainty of the measure's full effects on marijuana-related convictions and fines.

== Opponents and proponents ==
=== Opponents ===
In September 2014 the Oregon District Attorneys Association and Oregon State Sheriffs Association launched an organized opposition, Vote No on 91. Local opponents included The Oregon Pediatric Society, the Oregon chapter of the American Academy of Pediatrics, Medal of Honor recipient Robert D. Maxwell, state representatives John Huffman and Gene Whisnant, state senator Tim Knopp, the Oregon Republican Party, and others.

=== Proponents ===
- City Club of Portland
- Democratic Party of Oregon
- Earl Blumenauer, Democratic representative for Oregon's 3rd congressional district
- Jeff Merkley, Democratic Senator from Oregon
- New Approach Oregon
- Chief Petitioner Anthony Johnson
- Oregon State Council for Retired Citizens
- The Oregonian Editorial Board
- The Register-Guard Editorial Board

== Polling ==
Poll source	Date(s) administered	Sample size	Margin of error	Yes	No	Undecided
SurveyUSA	October 23–27, 2014	552	± 4.3%	52%	41%	7%
Elway Research	October 26–27, 2014	403	± 5.0%	44%	46%	7%
SurveyUSA	October 16–19, 2014	561	± 4.2%	48%	37%	15%
DHM Research	October 8–11, 2014	516	± 4.3%	52%	41%	7%
SurveyUSA	September 22–24, 2014	568	± 4.2%	44%	40%	16%
SurveyUSA	August 1–5, 2014	564	± 4.2%	51%	42%	6%
SurveyUSA	June 5–9, 2014	560	± 4.2%	51%	41%	8%

== Results ==
Measure 91
Choice	Votes	%
For	847,865	56.11
Against	663,346	43.89
Total	1,511,211	100.00
Registered voters/turnout	2,178,334	69.37

Yes-votes on Ballot Measure 91 prevailed in 14 counties, including Multnomah County by a margin of over 40 percent. Likewise, no-votes on Ballot Measure 91 prevailed in 22 counties, although Josephine County barely rejected the measure by just two votes, and Yamhill County only by 60 votes.

County	Yes	Votes	No	Votes	Total
Baker	40.53	2,939	59.47	4,313	7,252
Benton	60.49	23,092	39.51	15,086	38,178
Clackamas	52.12	83,159	47.88	76,399	159,558
Clatsop	56.47	8,251	43.53	6,361	14,612
Columbia	53.43	10,898	46.57	9,500	20,398
Coos	53.55	13,083	46.45	11,348	24,431
Crook	41.15	3,747	58.85	5,358	9,105
Curry	57.08	5,590	42.92	4,204	9,794
Deschutes	51.86	37,018	48.14	34,366	71,384
Douglas	45.49	19,214	54.51	23,020	42,234
Gilliam	40.88	370	59.12	535	905
Grant	35.20	1,171	64.80	2,156	3,327
Harney	34.28	1,036	65.72	1,986	3,022
Hood River	57.64	4,913	42.36	3,611	8,524
Jackson	53.37	44,843	46.63	39,181	84,024
Jefferson	43.72	3,073	56.28	3,956	7,029
Josephine	49.99	17,311	50.01	17,313	34,624
Klamath	43.87	10,228	56.13	13,084	23,312
Lake	38.14	1,232	61.86	1,998	3,230
Lane	60.65	89,926	39.35	58,352	148,278
Lincoln	61.96	12,349	38.04	7,583	19,932
Linn	47.26	21,043	52.74	23,483	44,526
Malheur	31.28	2,394	68.72	5,260	7,654
Marion	48.44	50,423	51.56	53,670	104,093
Morrow	34.02	1,097	65.98	2,128	3,225
Multnomah	71.38	213,137	28.62	85,474	298,611
Polk	47.75	14,697	52.25	16,084	30,781
Sherman	38.55	350	61.45	558	908
Tillamook	55.43	6,016	44.57	4,837	10,853
Umatilla	37.20	7,181	62.80	12,122	19,303
Union	40.96	4,258	59.04	6,138	10,396
Wallowa	38.84	1,423	61.16	2,241	3,664
Wasco	48.98	4,637	51.02	4,830	9,467
Washington	55.40	108,846	44.60	87,638	196,484
Wheeler	36.47	260	63.53	453	713
Yamhill	49.92	18,660	50.08	18,720	37,380

Source: Oregon State Elections Division

== See also ==
- Cannabis in Oregon
- "Burnside Burn", an event held on Portland's Burnside Bridge the night the law went into effect
- Oregon Ballot Measure 67 (1998)
