= 2008 Oregon Ballot Measure 61 =

Measure 61
- Creates mandatory minimum prison sentences for certain theft, identity theft, forgery, drug, and burglary crimes.

Results
Choice	Votes	%
Yes	848,901	48.90%
No	887,165	51.10%
Total votes	1,736,066	100.00%
Registered voters/turnout		85.7%
- Results by county

Oregon Ballot Measure 61 was an initiated state statute ballot measure that enacted law to create mandatory minimum prison sentences for certain theft, identity theft, forgery, drug, and burglary crimes.

The measure appeared on the November 4, 2008 general election ballot in Oregon, as did Measure 57 which dealt with similar issues, but in a different way. Measure 61 was narrowly rejected by little over 51% of Oregon voters. It was rejected by Benton, Hood River, Jackson, Lane, Lincoln, Multnomah, and Washington counties.

== Background ==
In 1994, Measure 11, another initiative proposed by Kevin Mannix, was passed, which set mandatory minimum sentences for violent crimes. It is responsible for 28% of today's prison population. Oregon uses the highest percentage of its state budget to lock up criminals and supervise parole of any state. Oregon has seen a growth in prison inmates from about 4,000 to more than 13,500.

If Ballot Measure 61, or the competitive measure proposed by the legislature, is passed, Oregon's prison population and percentage of state budget will become more pronounced. At the same time, Oregon has seen a greater drop in violent crime than the rest of the country on average since Measure 11 passed.

=== Measure 61 versus Measure 57 ===
In February 2008, some members of the Oregon State Legislature proposed a bill to put a legislatively referred ballot measure, Measure 57, on the November 2008 ballot that would compete with Measure 61, but which would have less stringent mandatory minimums in it. In response, Mannix said that this "stinks of political manipulation". His concern is with how the competing measure's ballot title is set. If the ballot title sounds tough-on-crime, voters—many of whom will judge the measure simply based on its title—might vote for it, even though (Mannix alleges) the competing legislative measure is "wimpy".

The key difference between the competing measures lies in how they treat first-time offenders. Measure 61 requires mandatory jail time for some first-time offenders; the competing measure does not.

Supporters of Measure 61 believe that the method of establishing the ballot title for Oregon ballot measures is unfair and gives the legislatively referred Measure 57 an undue advantage at the polls. For a citizen-initiated measure in Oregon, the ballot title is determined by the state's Attorney General. In the case of the measure that will compete with Measure 61, the claim has been made that the legislature plans to set the ballot title without going through those normal channels.,

== Specific provisions ==
Ballot Measure 61 enacted the following provisions:

- Sets mandatory minimum sentences for certain drug and property crimes and for identity theft.
- It establishes a new felony crime of motor vehicle theft.
- A person sentenced under Measure 61 sentencing guidelines must serve his or her full sentence—the sentence could not be reduced for any reason.
- The sentences must be served in state prison facilities and work camps.
- The state is to reimburse counties for the cost of pre-trial detention for persons sentenced under Measure 61.
- Manufacturing or dealing heroin or ecstasy requires 36 months in prison.
- Manufacturing or dealing meth or cocaine within 1000 feet of a school requires 36 months in prison.
- Persons convicted of burglarizing a residence or identity theft must serve a 36-month sentence.

=== Estimated fiscal impact ===
The state's Financial Estimate Committee prepares estimated fiscal impact statements for any ballot measures that will appear on the ballot. The estimate prepared by this committee for Measure 61 says:

- Measure 61 would require additional state spending of between $8–$10 million in the first year.
- In the second year, it would cost from $67–$88 million.
- In the third year, the cost would be $122–$178 million.
- In the fourth and subsequent years, the cost would rise to $164 million and on up.

The state's Criminal Justice Commission said that the Mannix measure will cost between $128–$200 million a year, whereas the competing measure, Measure 57, would cost between $65–70 million per year.

== Support ==
The chief petitioners for Measure 61 were Kevin Mannix, Duane Fletchall and Steve Beck. Kevin Mannix said that Oregon's incarceration rate is below the national average and that the costs are high because of well-compensated corrections officers. "You get what you pay for", Mannix argued, adding that state prisons are among the most drug-free in the country.

Oregon prison officials questioned the Pew Center's numbers, mentioned below, and also pointed out that the Department of Corrections funnels about 20 percent of its budget directly to counties for jails and parole.

Loren Parks, the biggest political contributor in Oregon history, donated over $100,000 to the campaign for this measure.

== Opposition ==
=== Arguments against Measure 61 ===
Notable arguments in opposition to the measure included:

- Prison budgets take away from other government programs.
- "The point is getting tough on crime has gotten tough on taxpayers".
- It is one-size-fits-all and doesn't take account of differing circumstances.

=== Donors opposing Measure 61 ===
Defend Oregon, as a committee, fought seven different ballot measures, and supported two others. As a result, it is not possible to discern how much of its campaign money was going specifically to defeat Measure 59. Altogether, the group raised over $6 million in 2008.

Major donations to the Defend Oregon group as of October 8 included:

- $4.1 million from the Oregon Education Association.,
- $100,000 from School Employees Exercising Democracy (SEED)
- $100,000 from the AFL-CIO.
- $50,000 from Oregon AFSCME Council 75.
