= 2008 Oregon Ballot Measure 57 =

Measure 57
- Increases Sentences For Drug Trafficking, Theft Against Elderly And Specified Repeat Property And Identity Theft Crimes; Requires Addiction Treatment For Certain Offenders

Results
Choice	Votes	%
Yes	1,058,955	61.39%
No	665,942	38.61%
Total votes	1,724,897	100.00%
Registered voters/turnout		85.7%
- Results by county Yes 50%-60% 60%-70%

Oregon Ballot Measure 57 (2008) or Senate Bill (SB) 1087 was a legislatively referred state statute that increased term of imprisonment for persons convicted of specified drug and property crimes under certain circumstances. The measure enacted law which prohibits courts from imposing less than a presumptive sentence for persons convicted of specified drug and property crimes under certain circumstances, and requires the Department of Corrections to provide treatment to certain offenders and to administer grant program to provide supplemental funding to local governments for certain purposes.

== Official Ballot Title ==
Increases Sentences For Drug Trafficking, Theft Against Elderly And Specified Repeat Property And Identity Theft Crimes; Requires Addiction Treatment For Certain Offenders

== Background ==
=== Competing ballot measures ===
A similar measure, (Oregon Ballot Measure 61 (2008), proposed by Kevin Mannix, was also approved for the November election.

The main differences were:

1) Measure 61 has mandatory prison time for some first time felony offenders, while SB 1087 only does so for repeat offenders

2) SB 1087 significantly increases funding for drug treatment programs, while Measure 61 provides none.

3) Measure 61 will cost $250–$400 million per two year budget cycle, while SB 1087 would only cost $140 million.

If both measures pass, the one with the most votes will go into effect.

=== An increase in prison inmates since 1994 ===
In 1994, Measure 11, an earlier initiative proposed by Kevin Mannix, was passed, which set mandatory minimum sentences for violent crimes. It is responsible for 28% of today's prison population. Oregon uses the highest percentage of its state budget to lock up criminals and supervise parole of any state. Oregon has seen a growth in prison inmates from about 4,000 to more than 13,500.

If SB 1087 or the initiative proposed by Mannix, is passed, Oregon's prison population and percentage of state budget will become more pronounced. However, Oregon has seen an even greater drop in violent crime than the rest of the country on average since Measure 11 passed.

== Support ==
Supporters include:

=== Organizations ===
- Measure 57 or The Better Way to Fight Crime Committee, which was a broad coalition of police officers, police chiefs, sheriffs, district attorneys, business leaders, teachers, parents, advocates for children and seniors and many more.
- Oregon Council of Police Associations
- Oregon Police Chiefs for Safer Communities
- Oregon Assoc. of Community Corrections Directors
- Federation of Oregon Parole and Probation Officers
- Juvenile Parole Officers – AFSCME Council 75
- AFSCME Corrections United
- Association of Oregon Corrections Employees
- Nominee, Oregon Attorney General, John Kroger
- AARP Oregon
- Stand for Children
- National Association of Social Workers-Oregon Chapter
- SEIU, Local 503, representing front-line workers at the Oregon Youth Authority, & 45,000 other workers
- SEIU, Local 49
- Oregon Prevention Education and Recovery Association
- Oregon Business Association
- Oregon Education Association
- Save Oregon Seniors
- Oregon State Council for Retired Citizens
- Advocacy Coalition for Seniors & People with Disabilities
- Oregon Alliance for Retired Americans
- Partnership for Safety & Justice
- Elders in Action Commission
- United Way of the Mid-Willamette Valley
- Ainsworth United Church of Christ, Justice Commission
- Community Action Relationship of Oregon
- Community Alliance of Tenants
- Community Providers Association of Oregon
- Human Services Coalition of Oregon (HSCO)
- Multnomah County Democrats
- Northwest Oregon Labor Council
- One Voice for Child Care
- Oregon AFL-CIO
- Oregon Consumer League
- Oregon Health Action Campaign
- Oregon Nurses Association
- Rural Organizing Project
- Association of Oregon Counties

=== Elected officials ===
==== Justices ====
- Former Oregon Supreme Court Justice Betty Roberts

==== Attorneys General ====
- Oregon Attorney General, Hardy Myers

==== Legislators ====
- Sen. Floyd Prozanski, D-Oregon, who said the legislative measure was widely supported by prosecutors, police and jail officials who know a lot more about fighting crime than Mannix.

==== Sheriffs ====
- Sheriff Southwick - Baker County
- Sheriff Diana Simpson – Benton County
- Sheriff Craig Roberts – Clackamas County
- Sheriff Tom Bergin – Clatsop County
- Sheriff Dennis Dotson – Lincoln County
- Sheriff Bob Skipper – Multnomah County
- Sheriff Todd Anderson – Tillamook County
- Sheriff John Trumbo – Umatilla County
- Sheriff Rasmussen, Union County
- Sheriff Jack Crabtree – Yamhill County

==== District Attorneys ====
- Matt Shirtcliff, Baker
- John S. Foote, Clackamas
- Joshua Marquis, Clatsop
- Steve Atchison, Columbia
- R. Paul Frasier, Coos
- Everett Dial, Curry
- Michael T. Dugan, Deschutes
- Timothy J. Colahan, Harney
- Marion Weatherford, Gilliam
- Ryan Joslin, Grant
- Edwin I. Caleb, Klamath
- Mark Huddleston, Jackson
- Peter Deuel, Jefferson
- Stephen Campbell, Josephine
- David Schutt, Lake
- Bernice Barnett, Lincoln
- Jason Carlile, Linn
- Walt Beglau, Marion
- Elizabeth Ballard, Morrow
- Michael D. Schrunk, Multnomah
- John Fisher, Polk
- Wade M. McLeod, Sherman
- William Porter, Tillamook
- Dean F. Gushwa, Umatilla
- Mona K. Williams, Wallowa
- Eric Nisley, Wasco
- Bob Hermann, Washington
- Brad Berry, Yamhill

==== County Commissioners ====
- Commissioner Annabelle Jaramillo - Benton County
- Commissioner Jay Dixon - Benton County
- Commissioner Don Lindly - Lincoln County
- Commissioner Mary Stern - Yamhill County

==== City Councilors ====
- City Councilor Betty Boche - Beaverton
- City Councilor Denny Doyle - Beaverton
- City Councilor Doug Pugsley - Dundee
- Mayor Robert Austin - Estacada
- Mayor Julie Hammerstad - Lake Oswego
- Councilor Deborah Barnes, Milwaukie
- Mayor Cheri Olson, North Plains

==== Others ====
- Rob Ingram, long-time youth advocate—Portland

A full list of supporters is available at the campaign website.

== Opposition ==
Kevin Mannix continues to promote his Measure 61. "Either way, we make progress," Mannix says. "I win some if [Measure] 57 passes, and the people win more if 61 passes."

Loren Parks "With the financial help of Nevada medical-device millionaire Loren Parks, Mannix easily gathered 149,000 signatures to place Measure 61 on the ballot."

Oregon Anti-Crime Alliance: The Oregon Anti-Crime Alliance is a new organization that brings together citizens with a mission of reducing crime in Oregon through reforms affecting prevention, investigation, prosecution, the courts, indigent defense, accountability, transition programs out of prison, prison work, treatment and rehabilitation.

Some Republicans attacked the measure for being "soft-on-crime". Kevin Mannix continues to promote his "tough-on-crime" initiative while pointing out the weaknesses of the competing measure. "We shouldn't be patsies and let drug dealers and identity thieves and burglars get a free pass on their first convictions, which is what they get on the legislative referral", he said.

For a citizen-initiated measure in Oregon, the ballot title is determined by the state's Attorney General. In the case of this measure, the legislature chose to supplant this process by inserting its own title.,

As of March, 2009, the number of counties that have sentenced pursuant Measure 57 sentences remains small. The reason for this seems to be that defendants are willing to plea to a lesser sentence in order to avoid the longer sentences mandated by the Measure.

== See also ==
- Oregon Ballot Measure 61 (2008)
- Methamphetamine in Oregon
- List of Oregon ballot measures
