= Conant v. Walters =

2002 Court of Appeals case

- Court: United States Court of Appeals for the Ninth Circuit
- Full case name: Dr. Marcus Conant, et al. v. John P. Walters, Director of the White House Office of National Drug Control Policy, et al.
- Argued: April 8, 2002
- Decided: October 29, 2002
- Citation: 309 F.3d 629

Case history
- Prior history: Conant v. McCaffrey, 2000 WL 1281174 (N.D. Cal. Sept. 7, 2000)
- Subsequent history: Certiorari denied, 540 U.S. 946 (2003)

Court membership
- Judges sitting: Mary M. Schroeder, Betty Binns Fletcher, Alex Kozinski

Case opinions
- Majority: Schroeder, joined by a unanimous court
- Concurrence: Kozinski

Conant v. Walters, 309 F.3d 629 (9th Cir. 2002), is a legal case decided by the United States Court of Appeals for the Ninth Circuit, which affirmed the right of physicians to recommend medical marijuana. The Court of Appeals affirmed the earlier decision of the United States District Court for the Northern District of California, which was filed under the caption Conant v. McCaffrey. Though the case involved chronic patients with untreatable diseases, the decision does not name these conditions as a prerequisite, nor does it limit drugs which may or may not be illegal.

== Background ==
The plaintiffs created a class action suit on behalf of licensed California physicians treating patients with any of several severe and chronic conditions who discuss, recommend, or approve the medical use of marijuana for medical reasons. The class also includes all such patients. The named plaintiffs include eleven physicians, a physician group, an AIDS patient organization, and six patients with terminal illnesses, including one who died during the course of the suit.

The case arose from two events: the November 1996 passage of California Proposition 215 which authorized medical marijuana, and a December 30, 1996 response to the law by the director of the Office of National Drug Control Policy which said

a practitioner's action of recommending or prescribing Schedule I controlled substances is not consistent with the 'public interest' (as that phrase is used in the federal Controlled Substances Act) and will lead to administrative action by the Drug Enforcement Administration to revoke the practitioner's registration.

The statement accompanied authorization for the U.S. Inspector General for Health and Human Services to exclude individuals from participation in Medicare and Medicaid programs, such as physicians who recommend marijuana to patients for medical purposes. Clarification two months later affirmed that mere discussion of any drugs with a patient was not grounds for sanction, but affirmed that physicians "may not intentionally provide their patients with oral or written statements in order to enable them to obtain controlled substances in violation of federal law."

== District Court decision ==
The district court's decision acknowledged that the government has a legitimate concern that physicians might recommend marijuana in bad faith. However, physicians in good faith using honest medical judgment should not fear DEA sanctions. Furthermore,

Given the doctrine of constitutional doubt, the government's construction of the Controlled Substances Act cannot stand. The government should be permanently enjoined from (i) revoking any physician class member's DEA registration merely because the doctor makes a recommendation for the use of medical marijuana based on a sincere medical judgment and (ii) from initiating any investigation solely on that ground. The injunction should apply whether or not the doctor anticipates that the patient will, in turn, use his or her recommendation to obtain marijuana in violation of federal law.

== Court of Appeals decision ==
The government appealed the District Court decision to the Ninth Circuit Court of Appeals, which issued its decision in 2002.

Again the doctors and patients won and the federal government lost, while Judge Alex Kozinski's concurrence also brought in the First Amendment right of patients to hear accurate information from their doctors, and the state of California's right to make its own laws without being subverted by federal commandeering. The ruling set a precedent protecting doctors, patients, and state medical marijuana programs in the ten states of the Ninth Circuit. The government again appealed the case, but the Supreme Court declined to take the appeal in a brief notice dated October 14, 2003.

== See also ==
- Cannabis in Oregon
- List of class action lawsuits
