= Ballot title =

A ballot title is the official, short, summary of a referendum that appears on the ballot. The goal of a good ballot title is to be a neutral summary that accurately conveys to voters the gist of what the proposed new law says or would do. The National Conference of State Legislatures says, "The ballot title and summary are arguably the most important part of an initiative in terms of voter education. Most voters never read more than the title and summary of the text of initiative proposals. Therefore, it is of critical importance that titles and summaries be concise, accurate and impartial."

== United States ==
=== Differences between states ===
One way that states differ in laws governing the initiative process has to do with whether the ballot title is determined before signatures are collected, or after.

Another way that states differ has to do with whether the ballot title is determined by the government (which could be a commission, a ballot title determination board, the Secretary of State, or some other election official) or whether the ballot title is determined by the political organization that is advocating for the measure.

=== Pre-circulation ballot titles ===
States where the ballot title is set prior to circulation include:

Alaska, Arkansas, California, Colorado, Idaho, Maine, Massachusetts, Mississippi, Missouri, Montana, North Dakota, Ohio, Oregon (In Oregon, the ballot title is set after 1,000 initial sponsorship signatures have been submitted) and Washington.

=== Post-circulation ballot titles ===
States where the ballot title is determined by the government after the signatures have been collected are:

Arizona, Michigan, Nebraska, Nevada, Oklahoma, Utah, Wyoming.
