= 2020 Oregon Ballot Measure 110 =

Oregon drug reclassification bill

Ballot Measure 110
- Addiction Recovery Centers: Provides statewide addiction/recovery services; marijuana taxes partially finance; reclassifies possession/penalties for specified drugs.

Results
Choice	Votes	%
Yes	1,333,268	58.46%
No	947,314	41.54%
Total votes	2,280,581	100.00%
- Results by county Yes: 50–60% 60–70% 70–80% No: 50–60% 60-70%

In November 2020, voters in the U.S. state of Oregon passed Ballot Measure 110, "[reclassifying] possession/penalties for specified drugs". It reclassifies possession of drugs including heroin, methamphetamine, PCP, LSD and oxycodone as a Class E civil violation. The Drug Policy Alliance, a New York-based non-profit organization was behind the measure and the measure also received financial support from the Chan-Zuckerberg Initiative.

The new law aimed to reverse racial disparities in policing, and was projected to reduce black arrests by 94%.

The new law came into effect on February 1, 2021.

In 2024, the measure was significantly amended by House Bill 4002, which repealed the drug decriminalization portion in response to growing public backlash against it. The bill, however, retains the provision of expanded access to drug addiction treatment using cannabis tax dollars. Starting September 1, 2024, possession of hard drugs was classified as a criminal misdemeanor outside of the regular A-E categorization system, carrying a sentence of up to 6 months of jail, which may be waived if the convictee enters into mandatory drug treatment.

== Results by county ==
County	Yes	Votes	No	Votes	Total
Baker	37.61	3,590	62.39	5,956	9,546
Benton	65.50	33,169	34.50	17,467	50,636
Clackamas	53.73	132,382	46.27	113,993	246,375
Clatsop	58.45	13,509	41.55	9,602	23,111
Columbia	50.55	15,765	49.45	15,425	31,190
Coos	45.24	16,050	54.76	19,426	35,476
Crook	36.46	5,443	63.54	9,487	14,930
Curry	52.47	7,528	47.53	6,820	14,348
Deschutes	55.93	67,296	44.07	53,035	120,331
Douglas	42.05	26,123	57.95	36,000	62,123
Gilliam	39.88	455	60.12	686	1,141
Grant	36.65	1,626	63.35	2,811	4,437
Harney	31.92	1,375	68.08	2,932	4,307
Hood River	65.31	8,216	34.69	4,364	12,580
Jackson	51.98	63,718	48.02	58,870	122,588
Jefferson	44.45	5,109	55.55	6,386	11,495
Josephine	46.88	23,043	53.12	26,110	49,153
Klamath	41.63	14,719	58.37	20,635	35,354
Lake	30.21	1,262	69.79	2,915	4,177
Lane	60.72	129,398	39.28	83,722	213,120
Lincoln	59.94	17,728	40.06	11,848	29,576
Linn	47.06	33,112	52.94	37,244	70,356
Malheur	39.25	4,483	60.75	6,938	11,421
Marion	54.39	86,367	45.61	72,423	158,790
Morrow	40.14	1,993	59.86	2,972	4,965
Multnomah	74.33	333,042	25.67	115,034	448,076
Polk	51.64	24,196	48.36	22,657	46,853
Sherman	37.82	438	62.18	720	1,158
Tillamook	53.76	8,792	46.24	7,561	16,353
Umatilla	44.15	13,874	55.85	17,553	31,427
Union	39.75	5,708	60.25	8,650	14,358
Wallowa	39.67	1,966	60.33	2,990	4,956
Wasco	54.24	7,384	45.76	6,229	13,613
Washington	63.79	194,522	36.21	110,429	304,951
Wheeler	38.26	352	61.74	568	920
Yamhill	52.38	29,535	47.62	26,855	56,390

== See also ==
- List of Oregon ballot measures
- Drug policy of Oregon
