= Drug Policy Alliance =

American non-profit advocacy organization

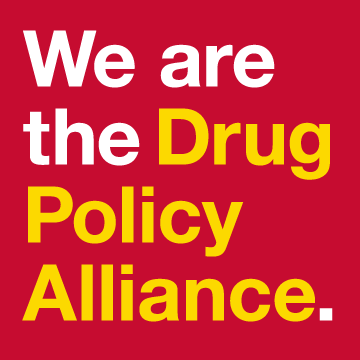
- Established: 2000 (26 years ago)
- Legal status: 501(c)(3) organization
- Headquarters: New York City
- Country: United States
- Revenue: 10,430,244 United States dollar (2016)
- Total Assets: 13,012,787 United States dollar (2020)
- Website: www.drugpolicy.org

The Drug Policy Alliance (DPA) is a New York City–based nonprofit organization that seeks to advance policies that "reduce the harms of both drug use and drug prohibition, and to promote the sovereignty of individuals over their minds and bodies". The organization prioritizes reducing the role of criminalization in drug policy, advocating for the legal regulation of marijuana, and promoting health-centered drug policies.

== History ==
The Drug Policy Alliance was formed when the Drug Policy Foundation and the Lindesmith Center merged in July 2000.

=== Leadership ===
Lindesmith Center founder Ethan Nadelmann served as its first executive director, followed by Maria McFarland Sánchez-Moreno beginning in October 2017. Kassandra Frederique has served as executive director since September 2020.

== Main issues ==
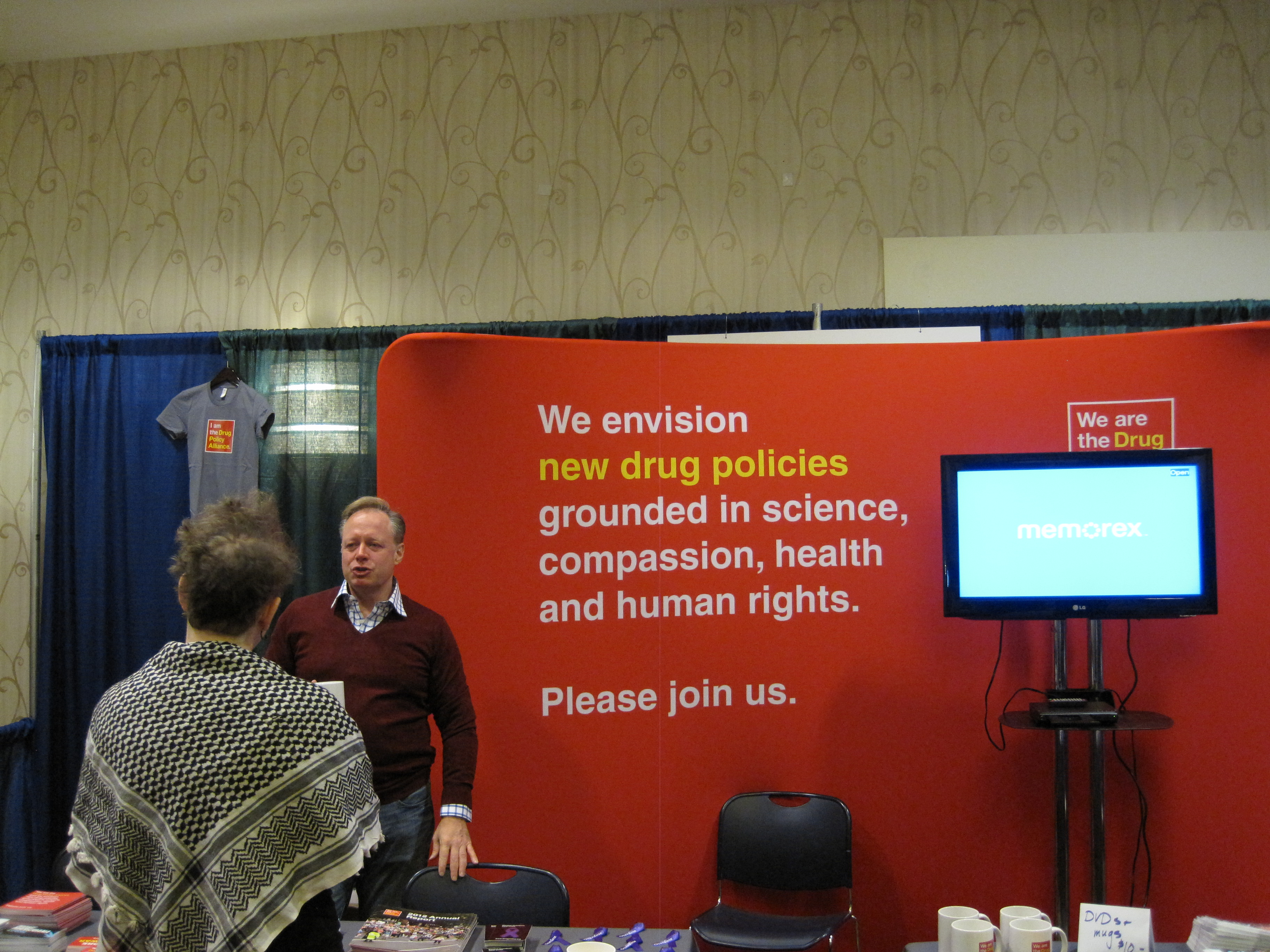
DPA booth at a 2012 conference

=== Drug war ===
DPA believes that the war on drugs in America has failed. They present the argument that the United States has spent billions of dollars on making the country drug-free, but many illicit drugs, such as heroin, cocaine, methamphetamine and many others, are more potent and prevalent than ever before.

=== Communities affected ===
DPA believes that the war on drugs does not affect all of the American population the same way, and that some communities are disproportionately affected.

== Results ==
In 2020, DPA's advocacy and political arm, Drug Policy Action, spearheaded the passage of the Oregon Ballot Measure 110, which made Oregon the first state in the nation to decriminalize drug possession while significantly expanding access to evidence-informed, culturally responsive treatment, harm reduction and other health services.

== See also ==
- Arguments for and against drug prohibition
- Decriminalization of marijuana in the United States
- Freedom of thought
- Harm reduction
- Prison reform
