= 1998 Oregon Ballot Measure 67 =

Referendum legalizing medical marijuana

Measure 67
- Allows Medical Use of Marijuana Within Limits; Establishes Permit System

Results
Choice	Votes	%
Yes	611,190	54.60%
No	508,263	45.40%
Total votes	1,119,453	100.00%
Registered voters/turnout		59.02%
- Results by county

The Oregon Medical Marijuana Act, a law in the U.S. state of Oregon, was established by Oregon Ballot Measure 67 in 1998, passing with 54.6% support. It modified state law to allow the cultivation, possession, and use of marijuana by doctor recommendation for patients with certain medical conditions. The Act does not affect federal law, which still prohibits the cultivation and possession of marijuana.

Measure 33 in 2004 sought to extend the law by mandating distribution centers, but was rejected by voters. Measure 74 in 2010 sought to provide access to medical cannabis for patients through licensed and regulated non-profit dispensaries, fund medical research, establish a program to assist low-income patients and help finance Oregon health programs.

== History and specifics of the law ==
The Act made Oregon the second state in the United States, after California's Proposition 215 in 1996, to remove criminal penalties for medical marijuana. It established the first state registry for medical marijuana users. Since the U.S. federal government does not recognize medical marijuana, the Act affects only state law. In other words, U.S. federal penalties remain.

The official ballot title given by the Oregon Secretary of State for the 1998 campaign was "Allows Medical Use of Marijuana Within Limits; Establishes Permit System". The measure removed state criminal penalties for patients with "debilitating medical conditions" whose doctor verifies the condition and that medical marijuana may help it. Some qualifying conditions include: cachexia, cancer, chronic pain, epilepsy and other disorders characterized by seizures, glaucoma, HIV or AIDS, multiple sclerosis and other disorders characterized by muscle spasticity, and nausea.

Patients obtain permits through the Oregon Department of Human Services and in 1998 could cultivate no more than seven marijuana plants, of which no more than three could be mature. They could possess no more than four ounces of usable marijuana (one on the person and one per mature plant).

The Oregon Medical Marijuana Program administers the program within the Oregon Department of Human Services. As of April 1, 2009, there were 20,974 patients registered, with 10,626 caregivers holding cards for these patients.

== Supporters and opponents ==
Groups supporting the ballot measure included Oregonians for Medical Rights and the American Civil Liberties Union, who stated that medical marijuana was a way to manage pain of those who were suffering from medical conditions. The measure was opposed by various groups including the Christian Coalition, Oregonians Against Dangerous Drugs, and then–Multnomah County Sheriff Dan Noelle, who claimed legalizing marijuana would be dangerous.

== Attempts to change the law ==
Measure 33
- Amends Medical Marijuana Act: Requires Marijuana Dispensaries For Supplying Patients/Caregivers; Raises Patients' Possession Limit

Results
Choice	Votes	%
Yes	764,015	42.78%
No	1,021,814	57.22%
Total votes	1,785,829	100.00%
Registered voters/turnout		86.48%
- Results by county

Measure 33 was placed on the ballot by initiative petition in 2004. It would have expanded the law, allowing the creation of nonprofit, state-licensed marijuana dispensaries which could sell marijuana to patients, and increasing the maximum amount of marijuana that patients could possess. The dispensaries would have been required to provide the drug to indigent patients for free. If, after six months of the measure's passage, a county lacked a dispensary, the county health division would have been granted a license to open a dispensary. The measure would also have increased to 6 pounds (2.72 kg) the amount of marijuana the patient may possess.

Supporters of Measure 33 claimed that the prohibition on marijuana sales to patients hindered their ability to obtain the quantities they need for treatment. They viewed this measure as a responsible solution to that problem. Some opponents argued that the measure was a back door legalization attempt. Some also feared that this expansion would have attracted the ire of the federal government, who would have attempted to shut down the entire Oregon medical marijuana program.

Voters rejected the measure, with 42.8% of votes in favor, 57.2% against.

The 2005 Oregon Legislature passed Senate Bill 1085, which took effect on January 1, 2006. The bill raised the quantity of cannabis that authorized patients may possess from seven plants (with no more than three mature) and three ounces of cannabis to six mature cannabis plants, 18 immature seedlings, and 24 ounces of usable cannabis. The bill also changed the penalty for exceeding the amount allowed for state-qualified patients. The new guidelines no longer give patients the ability to argue an "affirmative defense" of medical necessity at trial if they exceed the allowed number of plants. But patients who are within the limits retain the ability to raise an affirmative defense at trial even if they fail to register with the state.

Donna Nelson introduced a bill in the 2007 legislative session that would have prohibited law enforcement officials from using medical marijuana. Kevin Mannix, a former state legislator and former candidate for governor, circulated an initiative petition that would have asked voters in the 2008 general election to scale back the law. Neither was successful.

Medical cannabis reform activists filed Initiative 28, an initiative that would create a licensed and regulated medical marijuana supply system through non-profit dispensaries. The initiative was co-authored by John Sajo who helped draft the Oregon Medical Marijuana Act and Anthony Johnson who co-authored successful marijuana law reform measures while in law school at the University of Missouri-Columbia School of Law. Supporters argue that the measure is needed to ensure that patients have a supply of medical cannabis and that the imposed licensing fees will generate millions of dollars in revenue for the state. Fees collected from the dispensaries and their producers will be utilized to fund medical research, establish a program to assist-low income patients and help finance Oregon health programs, such as the Oregon Health Plan. The Coalition for Patients Rights first turned in over 61,000 signatures on January 11, 2010, to the Oregon Secretary of State and needed 82,769 valid signatures to qualify the measure for the November 2010 ballot. Members of the patients' rights coalition, including Oregon Green Free, Voter Power and Southern Oregon NORML eventually collected enough signatures to place the initiative on the ballot. On August 2, 2010, the Oregon Secretary of State announced that the non-profit dispensary proposal would be placed on the November ballot as Voters' Pamphlet, Measure 74, page 59.

Measure 74 has received great publicity across Oregon and earned the endorsement of the Democratic Party of Oregon, providing medical cannabis more mainstream support than it ever achieved in Oregon. 11 Oregon Voters' Pamphlet Arguments were submitted in support of Measure 74. Arguments were submitted by former Portland Police Chief and Mayor, Tom Potter; retired Oregon Supreme Court Justice Betty Roberts; former federal prosecutor Kristine Olson; as well as several doctors and nurses, including, Dr. Richard Bayer, Chief Petitioner of the Oregon Medical Marijuana Act.

Progressive Reform of Oregon (Pro-Oregon), a new 501 (c)(4) federal non-profit released the first commercial urging voters to support Measure 74. Pro-Oregon is dedicated to ending the War on Cannabis and implementing policies that promote freedom and equality under the law.

== See also ==
- Cannabis in Oregon
- Medical cannabis
- Gonzales v. Raich - US Supreme Court case, determined that medical marijuana violates federal law
- List of Oregon ballot measures
