= Drug policy of Oregon =

Overview of the drug policy of the U.S. state of Oregon

The U.S. state of Oregon has various policies restricting the production, sale, and use of different substances. In 2006, Oregon's drug use per person was higher than the national average, with marijuana, methamphetamine, and illicit painkillers being the most commonly used substances.

Oregon's drug policy has evolved significantly over time, reflecting changing societal attitudes and state responses to substance use. Alcohol regulation in Oregon dates back to pre-statehood, with the state pioneering both the prohibition and eventual regulation of alcohol through the creation of the Oregon Liquor Control Commission. The state's approach to other substances has also been notably progressive. Oregon was the first state to decriminalize small amounts of cannabis in 1973 and later legalized its use for both medical and recreational purposes. Other substances like methamphetamine, heroin, and club drugs have posed ongoing challenges, with laws evolving to address production, trafficking, and public health issues. Oregon has also been a leader in regulating prescription drug use and in recent years has decriminalized the personal possession of small amounts of all drugs under Ballot Measure 110, while legalizing the medical use of psilocybin mushrooms. However, this policy was partially reversed in 2024, marking a significant shift in the state's stance on drug decriminalization.

== Decriminalization ==
On February 1, 2021, Oregon became the first state in the USA to decriminalize the possession of small quantities of all illicit drugs, following the passing of Oregon Ballot Measure 110 in November 2020. The law was passed by 58% of voters in a ballot initiative. Among other provisions, it directs hundreds of millions of dollars from cannabis tax collections to addiction treatment. However, in 2024, Oregon partially reversed its drug laws, with the governor signing a new law which made possessing small amounts of hard drugs a misdemeanor starting September 1, 2024. However, the new law did not require mandatory jail time in all cases or apply to soft drugs, with cannabis tax revenue even still being maintained as a source of funding for drug treatment. The policy intended to redirect people away from the criminal justice system and toward treatment. However, critics argued that the law failed to adequately connect people with treatment services, and Oregon saw a continued rise in overdose deaths and public drug use.

== Recriminalization ==
In April 2024, Oregon Governor Tina Kotek signed House Bill 4002, effectively ending the full decriminalization of hard drugs and reintroducing criminal penalties for possession of substances such as fentanyl, methamphetamine, and heroin. The law took effect on September 1, 2024, and reclassified possession of small amounts of these substances as a Class C misdemeanor punishable by up to 30 days in jail. The new law includes provisions allowing law enforcement to direct individuals toward treatment rather than jail under a process called "deflection," which is designed to give individuals the opportunity to avoid criminal charges by completing a substance abuse screening and connecting with services. The measure aims to improve the balance between treatment and accountability, while also addressing the strain drug use has placed on public spaces, businesses, and emergency services.

== Specific drugs ==
=== Alcohol ===
Oregon ranks 4th nationally in craft breweries per capita

Oregonians consume an average amount of beer and distilled spirits, and an above average amount of wine. As of 2007, the consumption of spirits is on the rise, while beer consumption is holding steady. Also, 11% of beer sold in Oregon was brewed in-state, the highest figure in the United States.

Oregon was the first place in the United States to prohibit alcohol, prior to becoming a U.S. state in the mid-19th century. That law was quickly repealed, but Oregon again preceded the rest of the country in outlawing alcohol, passing a law several years before federal prohibition was enacted with the Eighteenth Amendment to the United States Constitution. Following the repeal of prohibition in 1933, Oregon acted swiftly to regulate alcohol, establishing the Oregon Liquor Control Commission (OLCC) within days of the repeal. The OLCC continues to regulate alcohol in the state today.

=== Cannabis ===
From 1999 through 2005, the ratio of Oregonians using cannabis outpaced the general United States population by 32–45%, with between 6.53% (2000) and 8.96% (2002) of the population using it. In 2003–2004, Oregon ranked among the top five states for cannabis usage of people 12 and older. Oregon is also one of the largest cannabis producing states, ranking fourth in indoor production, and 10th overall in 2006.

In 1973, Oregon became the first U.S. state to decriminalize the possession of small amounts of cannabis, and in 1998 the state legalized its use for medical purposes. An attempt to recriminalize possession of small amounts of cannabis was turned down by Oregon voters in 1997. In June 2010, Oregon became the first state in the country to reclassify marijuana from a Schedule I drug to a Schedule II drug when the Oregon Board of Pharmacy voted for reclassification. Recreational cannabis has been legal in the state since July 2015.

=== Club drugs ===
In Oregon, MDMA (3,4-methylenedioxymethamphetamine), GHB (gamma-hydroxybutyrate), ketamine, and LSD are available in varying quantities and are generally used at social venues in more populated areas and on college campuses. Club drugs enter Oregon from a variety of sources: MDMA from Canada, ketamine from Mexico, and GHB and LSD from California. Laboratory seizures indicate some local GHB and LSD production. GHB is also obtained from Internet sources. PCP and Psilocybin mushrooms are generally available in and around cities with a college student population.

=== Cocaine ===
Cocaine is available throughout Oregon, and crack cocaine is available in some urban areas. Mexican traffickers dominate wholesale distribution, transporting the drug from Mexico, California, and other southwestern states. Retail quantities are primarily sold by Mexican drug trafficking organizations, street gangs, prison gangs, and local independent dealers. In 2007, 63.7 pounds of cocaine were seized by federal authorities, up from 36.4 pounds in 2006.

=== Heroin ===
In the 1990s, potent and inexpensive heroin became widely available in Portland; heroin use in Multnomah County rose 600% during that decade.

According to police, in 2008, heroin became more plentiful in Oregon in response to a crackdown on methamphetamine. In 2007, 115 heroin overdoses resulted in death, up 29% from 2006. In 2012 heroin was responsible for 147 deaths, and the leading cause of overdose deaths in the state. The number of deaths is far below the highs of the late 1990s. Most deaths are a result of the user misgauging their tolerance. Heroin is especially lethal because it depresses the central nervous system, unlike cocaine and meth which are stimulants.

In Oregon, black tar heroin comes from Mexico up the Interstate 5 corridor. In 2007, 19 pounds of heroin were seized by federal authorities, more than double the amount in 2006.

=== Methamphetamine ===
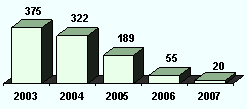
Methamphetamine lab incidents in Oregon, 2003–2007

Since its arrival in the early 1980s, the use of methamphetamine in Oregon has become a serious public health problem. Abuse of methamphetamine (commonly known as "crystal meth" or simply "meth") has spread across the state and the rest of the United States. The issue has been a focus of media organizations in the state, and has been a focus of several political campaigns, including that of Attorney General-elect John Kroger in 2008, and ballot measures such as Measures 57 and 61 in the same year.

In 2005, Governor Ted Kulongoski signed legislation that made Oregon the first state to require prescriptions for cold medicines containing pseudoephedrine, one of the key ingredients used to make methamphetamine. The state had previously required buyers to show ID and sign a log when buying cold medicine like Sudafed and Claritin D. The intent of the law was to reduce the number of home methamphetamine laboratories. Oregon's monthly home drug lab seizures dropped from 41 to nine after the restrictions were put in place, but the drug is still available, coming from Mexican labs and from other states. Meth-related deaths decreased for the first time since 2001, when 2007 deaths declined 21% from 2006 deaths.

In 2007, 33 pounds of meth were seized by federal authorities, down from 101.6 pounds in 2006.

=== Prescription drugs ===
Illicit use of prescription drugs is the fastest growing category of illegal drug use. Treatment admissions for illicit prescription drugs increased 332% from 1998 to 2008, surpassing cocaine admissions in 2005. In the United States, the primary methods of diversion of legitimate pharmaceuticals is illegal dispensing and prescribing by physicians, illegal distribution by pharmacists, prescription forgery, doctor shopping, and drug thefts from pharmacies, nursing homes, and hospitals. Pharmacy burglaries are prevalent throughout the state and Diversion Investigators are also encountering pharmaceuticals that have been purchased via the Internet without a doctor's prescription. The use and sale of oxycodone (OxyContin, Percocet, Percodan), hydrocodone (Vicodin, Lortab), and anabolic steroids are of concern to the Drug Enforcement Administration. Also, as of January 2008, methadone use has increased dramatically in the state.

=== Psilocybin and psilocybin mushrooms ===
As part of the passing of Oregon Ballot Measure 110, which came into effect on February 1, 2021, the personal possession of psilocybin and psilocybin mushrooms (also known as "magic mushrooms") was decriminalized.

As part of Oregon Ballot Measure 109 the "manufacture, delivery and administration" of psilocybin and psilocybin mushrooms was legalized for those aged 21 and over for medical purposes, such as mental health treatment and use in supervised and licensed therapy sessions. Oregon Ballot Measure 109 created Oregon Psilocybin Services, a state agency that regulates the licensed use of psilocybin in Oregon.

=== Tobacco ===
Oregon's Tobacco Prevention and Education Program (TPEP) was launched in 1997 to "reduce tobacco-related illness and death" by reducing exposure to secondhand smoke, countering pro-tobacco influences, helping users to quit, and eliminating health disparities. As of 2020, the current tax on a pack of cigarettes is $1.33, and the wholesale tax on other tobacco products is 65%. House Bill 2270 was referred to voters by the legislature as Measure 108 for the 2020 general election, to raise the cigarette tax to $3.33 per pack, increase a cap on cigar taxes from 50¢ to $1.00 each, and apply the wholesale tax to electronic cigarettes. Measure 108 was passed by voters, signed into law and effective January 1, 2021.

Smoking in bars and similar businesses is prohibited in Oregon as of a law that took effect January 2009 (SB 571 of the 2007 legislature.)

== Usage ==
In 2008, academic researchers began studying waste water at various Oregon sewage plants, to evaluate the drug use of various communities. Their research is pioneering the field in the United States, though similar studies have been done in Europe. Every one of the samples, taken from 96 plants, contained methamphetamine; Cocaine was present in 80% of the samples, MDMA in 40%. the research is ongoing, and will evaluate some of the plants—along with plants in Washington—over time.

== Penalties ==
The penalties for sale of a controlled substance varies between states. In Oregon, a person convicted three times of selling 3.3 pounds of meth would face a maximum of four years in prison. By comparison, the potential penalty would be 13 years in prison in California, 21 years in federal court, and up to life in Texas. Former Oregon lawmaker Kevin Mannix wants to increase these penalties, saying the state "invites" criminal drug activity "by being passive." Mannix put a citizen's initiative on the November 2008 ballot, Measure 61. The measure was defeated, while a less expensive measure referred by the legislature, Measure 57, passed. Mannix's opponents argued that increased mandatory minimum sentences remove judicial discretion and send small-time dealers into expensive prisons instead of drug treatment.

In 2024, with the passage of House Bill 4002, Oregon formally reintroduced criminal penalties for the possession of small amounts of certain controlled substances. Under the new law, individuals found in possession may face arrest and jail time unless they participate in deflection programs offering treatment alternatives. The penalties reflect a hybrid model aimed at deterring open drug use while expanding access to care for substance use disorders.
