= Portland Hempstalk Festival =

Cannabis event in Portland, Oregon, U.S.

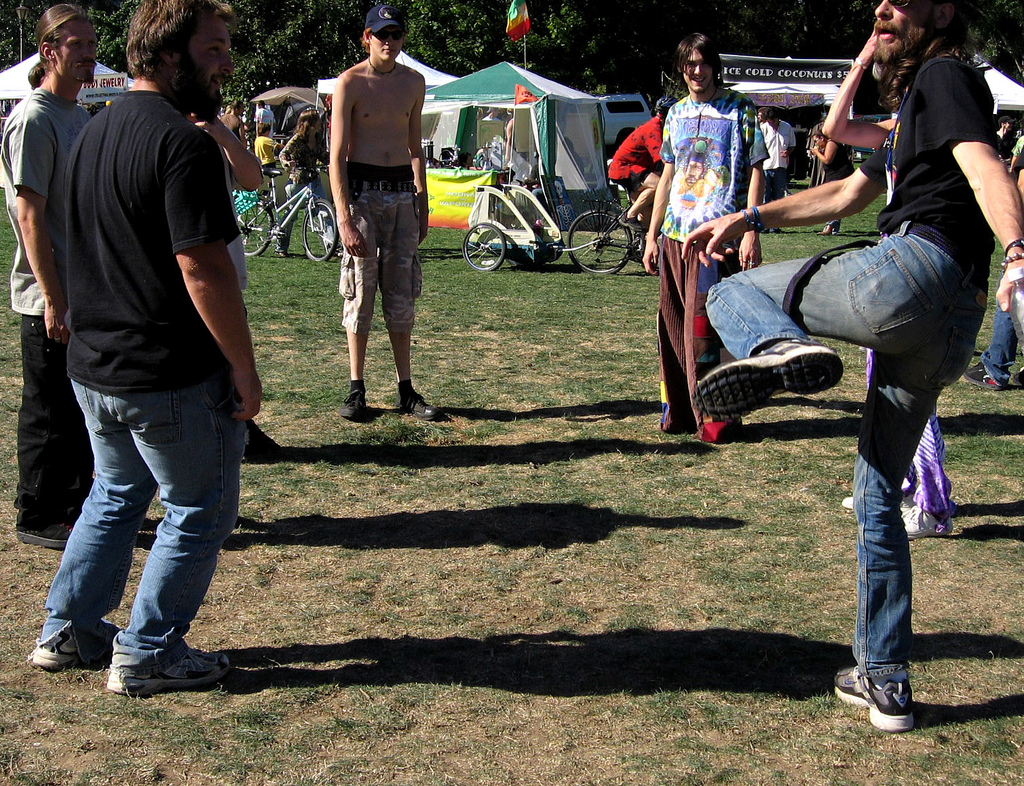
- Festival goers at the 2007 Hempstalk in Portland, Oregon playing Hackey Sack
- Locations: Portland, Oregon
- Years active: 2005–present
- Website: hempstalk.org

Portland's Hempstalk Festival is an annual event in Portland, Oregon advocating decriminalization of marijuana for medicinal, industrial, and recreational use. Founded in 2005, the festival often takes place the weekend after Labor Day and features food vendors, live music, and information booths. The event has always been free to attend.

According to Paul Stanford, founder and director of the event:

Hempstalk is about the many uses of industrial hemp fiber, oil, protein, fuel and medicine. We are working to end adult cannabis prohibition, allow adults to grow their own and license the legal sale of psychoactive cannabis to adults. We believe that hemp will save the Earth's biosphere with the adoption of hemp seed for bio-diesel fuel, which will solve the energy and world hunger problems, and stop deforestation when hemp fiber is used for paper and building materials. We support the Oregon Cannabis Tax Act of 2010, to implement this. We shall overcome!

== History ==
The Portland Hempstalk Festival is an annual, two-day event. Hempstalk was first held in Portland, Oregon's Tom McCall Waterfront Park in downtown Portland in 2005 and 2006, with about 10,000 visitors each of the first two years.

In 2007, nearly 20,000 people attended the third annual Hempstalk festival at Sellwood Riverfront Park. While organizers insisted smoking would not be tolerated, the smell of marijuana lingered in the air and some festival goers chose to consume various forms of cannabis foods. No festival attendees were arrested. Originally slated for Tom McCall Waterfront Park, the event was temporarily canceled by Portland Parks & Recreation due to "unspecified 'problems' the city encountered with the event in the past two years there." According to the Hempstalk official site, after being denied a permit at Waterfront Park based upon the city's ruling, the previous location was already booked and the City Parks & Recreation Department "refused to issue a permit to use a different park, citing unsubstantiated claims that minors were drinking beer in the park ... and widespread marijuana smoking was taking place (not in public view and only by medical marijuana patients)." Hempstalk officials deny these claims. Due to limited space, officials had doubts about hosting the event at Sellwood Riverfront Park in the future.

In 2008, the festival was held in Eastbank Festival Plaza, organized by Paul Stanford of The Hemp and Cannabis Foundation (THCF). In addition to the usual events and activities featured, the two-day event offered educational panels to inform attendants about industrial hemp, the legal use of marijuana, and answer any other questions they may have.

On September 12–13, 2009, the Portland Hempstalk Festival moved to Kelley Point Park, in the far Northwest corner of Portland, Oregon, at the confluence of the Columbia River and the Willamette River. 40,000 people attended over two days. Music was performed by Native American political activist, poet and songwriter John Trudell and his band, Bad Dog, Folk Uke (Amy Nelson and Cathy Guthrie, daughters of Willie Nelson and Arlo Guthrie), the Herbivores, Rocker T, the Human Revolution, Binghi & the Seventh Seal, State of Jefferson, Marquee, Pass Margo and Tim Pate. Speakers included famed author and activist, Jack Herer, making his fifth Hempstalk appearance. Herer had a heart attack and collapsed moments after giving a speech on Saturday, September 12. He was in critical condition in a Portland area hospital for a month and moved to a Eugene, Oregon nursing home in early October 2009 for further recovery.

Other Hempstalk speakers have included National Organization for the Reform of Marijuana Laws (NORML) founder Keith Stroup, NORML director Allen St. Pierre, THCF and CRRH director and author of the Oregon Cannabis Tax Act Paul Stanford, Oregon NORML director Madeline Martinez, Chris Conrad, Mikki Norris, comedian and writer Ngaio Bealum, Green Party 2012 presidential candidate, Jill Stein, author Bill Drake, Dr. Tod Mikuriya, Dr. Phillip Leveque, Seattle Hempfest director Vivian McPeak, and medical marijuana pioneer, Dennis Peron.

== See also ==
- Culture of Portland, Oregon
- Legal history of cannabis in the United States
