= 2012 Oregon Ballot Measure 80 =

Cannabis-related referendum

Measure 80
- Allows personal marijuana, hemp cultivation/use without license; commission to regulate commercial marijuana cultivation/sale.

Results
Choice	Votes	%
Yes	810,538	46.75%
No	923,071	53.25%
Valid votes	1,733,609	106.06%
Invalid or blank votes	−99,033	−6.06%
Total votes	1,634,576	100.00%
- Results by county

Oregon Ballot Measure 80, also known as the Oregon Cannabis Tax Act, OCTA and Initiative-9, was an initiated state statute ballot measure on the November 6, 2012 general election ballot in Oregon. It would have allowed personal marijuana and hemp cultivation or use without a license and created a commission to regulate the sale of commercial marijuana. The act would also have set aside two percent of profits from cannabis sales to promote industrial hemp, biodiesel, fiber, protein, and oil.

Measure 80 was defeated 53.44%-46.56%.

== Ballot qualification ==
OCTA organizers stated a goal of collecting 130,000 signatures of registered Oregon state voters before submitting a request to the Secretary of State for ballot inclusion. The deadline for turning in signatures was July 6, 2012, and was declared qualified to appear on the November 2012 ballot on July 13.

== Certified Ballot Title ==
Allows personal marijuana, hemp cultivation/use without license; commission to regulate commercial marijuana cultivation/sale

Result of a "Yes" Vote: "Yes" vote allows commercial marijuana (cannabis) cultivation/sale to adults through state-licensed stores; allows unlicensed adult personal cultivation/use; prohibits restrictions on hemp (defined).

Result of a "No" Vote: "No" vote retains existing civil and criminal laws prohibiting cultivation, possession and delivery of marijuana; retains current statutes that permit regulated medical use of marijuana.

Summary: Currently, marijuana cultivation, possession and delivery are prohibited; regulated medical marijuana use is permitted. Measure replaces state, local marijuana laws except medical marijuana and driving under the influence laws; distinguishes "hemp" from "marijuana"; prohibits regulation of hemp. Creates commission to license marijuana cultivation by qualified persons and to purchase entire crop. Commission sells marijuana at cost to pharmacies, medical research facilities, and to qualified adults for profit through state-licensed stores. Ninety percent of net goes to state general fund, remainder to drug education, treatment, hemp promotion. Bans sales to, possession by minors. Bans public consumption except where signs permit, minors barred. Commission regulates use, sets prices, other duties; Attorney General to defend against federal challenges/prosecutions. Provides penalties. Effective January 1, 2013; other provisions.

== Stance on initiative ==
=== In support of passing the measure ===
- Pacific Green Party
- Oregon NORML
- United Food and Commercial Workers, Local 555
- Former Secretary of State Bill Bradbury
- State Representative Peter Buckley

=== In opposition of passing the measure ===
- Governor John Kitzhaber

== See also ==
- Oregon Ballot Measure 91 (2014), subsequent successful effort to legalize recreational use of cannabis in Oregon
- Cannabis in Oregon
- Controlled substances in Oregon
- Decriminalization of non-medical cannabis in the United States

Similar initiatives

- California Proposition 19 (2010)
- Colorado Amendment 64
- Washington Initiative 502
