= Women in the cannabis industry =

Gender representation and bias

Women have been active in the cannabis industry, cannabis legalization, cannabis testing, and cannabis rights since the earliest days of commercialization, but they have also faced gendered obstacles impeding their growth in an industry worth over 12 million dollars since 2019. "The American cannabis industry accounted for $10 billion of 2018’s [global] figures, with the average U.S. dispensary pulling in $3 million a year."

Women took the helm in new businesses and markets as recreational cannabis was legalized particularly in four states—Alaska, Colorado, Oregon and Washington—from 2012 to 2014. Female executives and business owners in the budding market contribute to one of the biggest cash crop industries in the US as of 2022. In 2015, one report found that women were 36% of cannabis executives, which was an outstanding figure for a new industry. Four years later, one report indicated that just 17% of executives were women. Although women-owned cannabis businesses were reportedly making about three times as much as male-led businesses, raising capital tended to favor the latter. Gender bias has been a significant factor in policy decisions and organizational success due to anecdotal research showing an increase in women's influence on the cannabis market.

Consumers of cannabis are increasing in Massachusetts, for instance, yet only 4.7% of cannabis businesses are owned by women in the state of Massachusetts compared to 19.3% of businesses in other industries.

According to some sources, the cannabis industry is a particularly woman-friendly environment and has a higher percentage of women than many other industries for several reasons. Cited reasons include its founding by "liberally minded rebels" less bound by gender conformity; and its being relatively new and "unhampered by established business networks" closed to women, and the lack of glass ceilings in some parts of the industry, especially "support" activities such as finance and investment, marketing, delivery, and agronomy research. Women comprised over 60% of executives in cannabis product testing laboratories in 2015, the highest rate of women executives in the cannabis industry. According to data analysis expert Giadha DeCarcer, "The cannabis industry is so new that there are very few barriers to get in, especially for women [entrepreneurs]".

== Leadership in product testing and consumer safety ==
Several women have played pioneering roles in analytical chemistry and microbiology labs focused on cannabis and hemp product testing and consumer safety. Given the fast-pace of the commercial recreational marijuana sector since 2012, testing cannabis crops was not well regulated by any governmental entity.

Rowshan Reordan, a licensed attorney in the state of Oregon since 2006, was among the early innovators in the sector. In 2011, Reordan opened Oregon's Green Leaf Lab LLC, the first accredited, woman-owned, and nearly all-women run cannabis and hemp analytical testing laboratory in the United States. After questioning whether a close friend, who later lost a battle with HIV, had access to clean, tested cannabis, the founder and CEO went on to open a second accredited cannabis and hemp analytical laboratories in California. Green Leaf Lab trademarked their "Cannalysis" process of analytic cannabis testing that employed trained chemists using standardized and peer reviewed analytic testing equipment.

In 2019, Green Leaf Lab filed a complaint ending in a legal battle that became part of a critical issues around the need to protect proprietary lab procedures and issues of transparency around the emergent cannabis industry's regulatory standards in analytical chemical testing of cannabis potency. Accusations of improriety were dismissed in U.S. California Central District Court. (see thumbnail for Order to Dismiss with Prejudice).

Case No. 8-18-cv-001451-JVS-JDE US District Court California Order to Dismiss With Prejudice

In 2013, she had joined a subcommittee on testing medical marijuana for Oregon's House Bill 3460. Green Leaf Lab was a strong advocate for safe testing of medical and recreational cannabis in the U.S. In 2015. Reordan gave a statement before the Oregon Legislature outlining eight product safety and public health recommendations to better regulate the cannabis industry:

1. Laboratories should have regulatory oversight. This will ensure a system where there is accountability and standardization for the safety testing of cannabis.
2. Independent Third-Party Testing should be required. ... It is in the best interest of Oregon patients and consumers to have an Oregon-based regulatory agency that follows national quality standards that are known to be more stringent than international standards.
3. Laboratories should be required to perform random sampling and initiate a chain of custody system for batch testing certification.
4. More stringent microbiological (mold) testing should be required. The current law requires general screening for molds. This screening process does not require identification of harmful molds (for instance, Aspergillus, of which certain species can produce toxins). The current system allows harmful molds to "pass" if the overall screen falls below 10,000 colony forming units per gram. We believe that requiring a more specific microbiological screen for harmful molds will promote public health and safety.
5. More specific pesticide testing should be required.
6. Residual solvent testing should be required.
7. Standardized methods for potency testing should be required. ... [to] support a system that patients and consumers can trust.
8. Laboratory and testing standards should protect public health, while taking into consideration affordable testing and the legitimization of the cannabis industry. Because cannabis testing is in its infancy, there are many theories regarding the best way to analyze cannabis for safe use.

Another leader, Larisa Bolivar, has been a changemaker and advocate for consumer rights in cannabis. For two decades, she has been an advocate for social equity and justice as the executive director of the Cannabis Consumer Coalition whose activism has brought attention to patient and caregiver rights since the shift from legalizing medical marijuana to the rise of recreational marijuana. In a 2022 interview, Bolivar was lauded for discovering the "first list of offending" growers in Colorado after "health officials started flagging commercial weed for dangerous pesticides in 2015." In the same interview, she called attention to gender inequities that appear to be linked to "wealthy white men" crowding out emergent markets with little concern for clean cannabis and hemp. "We still have a lot of messes to clean in Colorado cannabis and hemp," she said, "and right now social equity is a big one."

Other early women advocates of clean cannabis and analytical testing have included Dr. Michelle Sexton, a naturopathic doctor and clinician specializing in botanical medicine and cannabinoid pharmacology as Chief Officer of Phytalab in Washington State, Bethany Sherman, owner of Eugene, Oregon's OG Analytical cannabis lab (forced out of her position due to racist behavior in 2017), and Camille Holiday.

Sexton was a former research scientist at Bastyr University who later worked at the Center for Cannabis and Social Policy, a 501(c)(3) non-profit public charity founded in 2013. The Center is an advocate for a drug war-free world where "social control rather than public safety" is the priority. Sexton was the editor and technical advisor for the state of Washington's official guide for cannabis quality control. Discussing the obstacles in scientific marijuana research, Sexton's personal view was that obtaining funding was a far more significant barrier than gender discrimination for women in the field.

While women have been able to get in on the ground floor as scientists and owners of testing labs despite hostilities towards women, gender inequalities in obtaining funding is also an issue leading to supportive affinity groups such as the for-profit networking group Women Grow in Denver, Colorado founded in 2014 by Jane West. Women Grow welcomes "canna-curious" to cannabis professional women, as well as men.

Women continue to play important roles in scientists, attorneys, business leaders, rights advocates, creatives in cooking, filmmaking, and writing, in governance, and in journalism.

== Women of color ==
The first legally owned African American dispensary in the U.S. opened in 2023, decades after the recreational market began. Pioneer Wanda James is its owner, using her presence in the industry to challenge social justice issues alongside dispensing her products. Boston also has a new Black-owned operator offering advice to millennials.

African Americans were disproportionately targeted and imprisoned for marijuana use when it was part of the war on drugs campaign under the Nixon Administration in the 1970s. Blacks and hippies were targeted by the administration in dog whistle politics of racism and the undoing of left-leaning social movements of the 1950s and 60s.

On June 17, 1971, then-President Richard Nixon declared a war on drugs, an announcement sparking a new offensive in drug policing. It's something then-White House counsel John Ehrlichman would later admit in an interview was a political ploy against two of Nixon's enemies: Blacks and the antiwar left, thus exposing their use of heroin and marijuana, respectively.

The racial disparity around arrests and criminalization continues throughout diverse communities, for example, among Filipinos in San Francisco. The ACLU continues to call for social reform around this form of injustice. Women of color, for example African American women, have been leaders in cannabis dispensaries, particularly in the Deep South, where the inequities of Jim Crow and generational trauma that continues to prevent the accumulation of wealth in communities of color.

[C]annabis has been increasingly profitable for white people, while people of color continue to be targeted by the drug war. Twelve of the nation's top multistate operators were valued between $59 million and $4 billion in 2019. Most of these enterprises – nearly 81 percent, according to a 2017 survey by Marijuana Business Daily – are owned by white people, mostly white men.

Following the opening of a medical-marijuana business in 2019, Washington, D.C. attorney Sherri Blount (pronounced "blunt") with her sister and other women as partners, began investing in black-owned multistate operations during the COVID-19 pandemic. Their company Blounts & Moore, LLC was the first in the country.

During the COVID-19 pandemic, when so many small businesses were lost, a disproportionate number were owned and operated by women of color, according to the National Bureau of Economic Research. Women view the work they do in the cannabis sector as a form of activism. They are "trying to close this gap... staking their claim in the same game that’s been used to criminalize their communities for decades."

With the legalization of "weed" or other marijuana or cannabis products, women of color including Latina or Latinx women and Indigenous women can build their own wealth while helping their communities recover from structural violence.

Representation among operators in the industry matters yet even the presence of women of color has been exploited by white operators, as reported in a 2020 report in the L.A.Times.

Below is a list of women in the industry since as early as 2012. The U.S. Cannabis has a long legal history in the U.S. from criminalization to liberalization given the emerging markets of legalizing medicinal and recreational use of cannabis and women have and continue to play a significant role in its emergence. Issues relating to gender bias or sexism as well as gender equality and inclusion are factors in the emerging sectors of the industry, particularly in Colorado, California, and Oregon.

== Medical and academic research ==
- Sula Benet, anthropologist and biblical scholar
- Julie Holland, psychopharmacologist, psychiatrist, and author
- Amanda Reiman, Researcher and professor and leader at Marijuana Law and Policy unit of the Drug Policy Alliance
- Sue Sisley, psychiatrist

== Attorneys ==
- Allison Margolin

== Business leaders ==
- Giadha DeCarcer
- Charlo Greene
- Jody Hall, founder of Goodship
- Rylie Maedler, CEO of Rylie's Sunshine
- Christine Meeusen
- Lisa Snyder and Samantha Montanaro, co-owners of Tokeativity in Portland, Oregon.
- Madeline Martinez, longtime Latinx marijuana legalization advocate, former owner of Oregon's World Famous Cannabis Cafe, and NORML Board member.
- Ah Warner, owner and operator of Cannabis Basics, an entirely female staffed company, owning one of the first trademarks for a company that specializes in cannabis and hemp-infused products.
- Rowshan Reordan , attorney turned leading entrepreneur in cannabis product safety. Reordan opened the first all-women run analytical chemical testing lab for cannabis and hemp in Oregon. She served with Bethany Sherman (OG Analytical, Eugene) on the Oregon Liquor and Cannabis Commission's Recreational Marijuana Technical Advisory Subcommittee on Laboratories and Traceability.

== Cannabis rights advocates ==
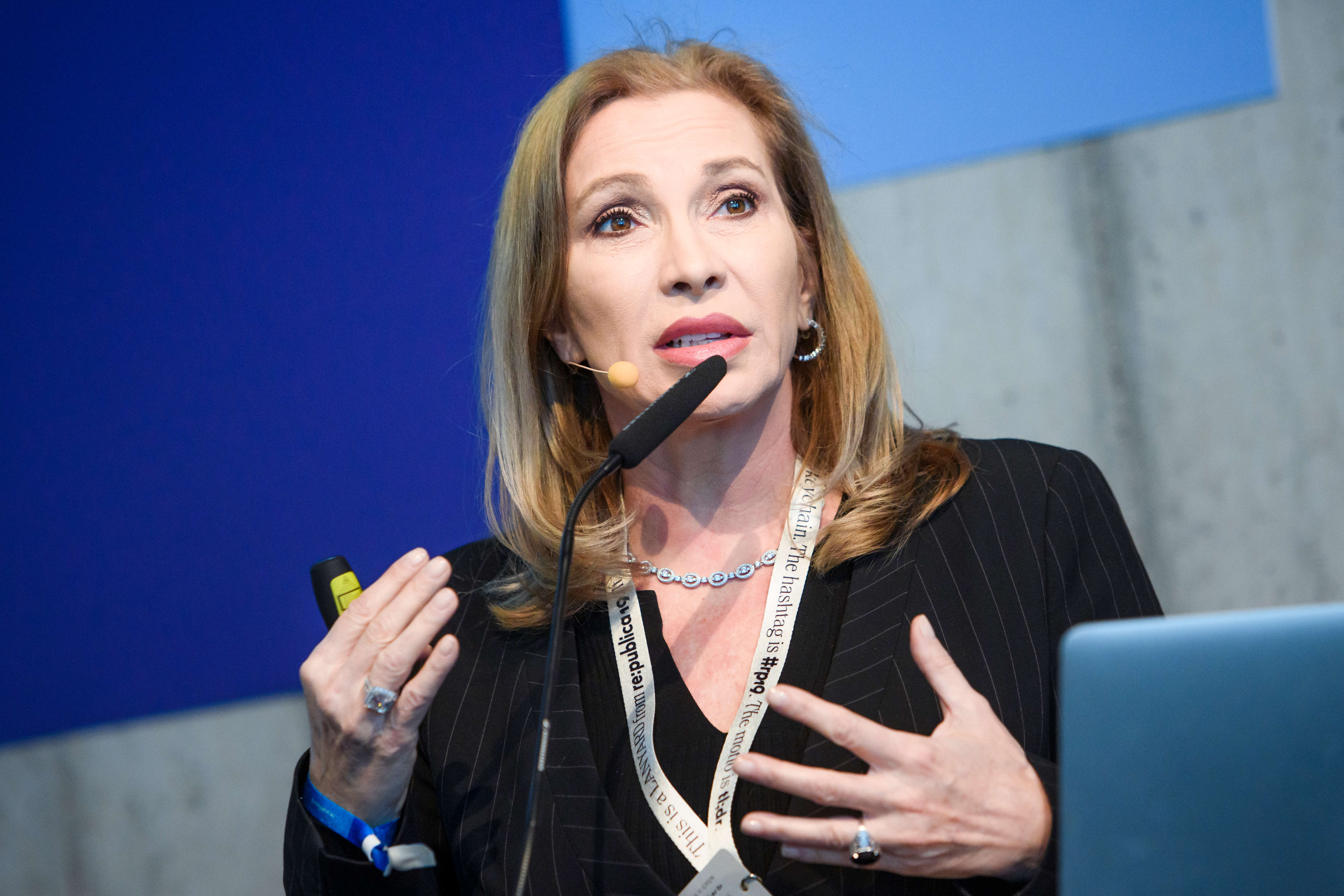
Cheryl Shuman

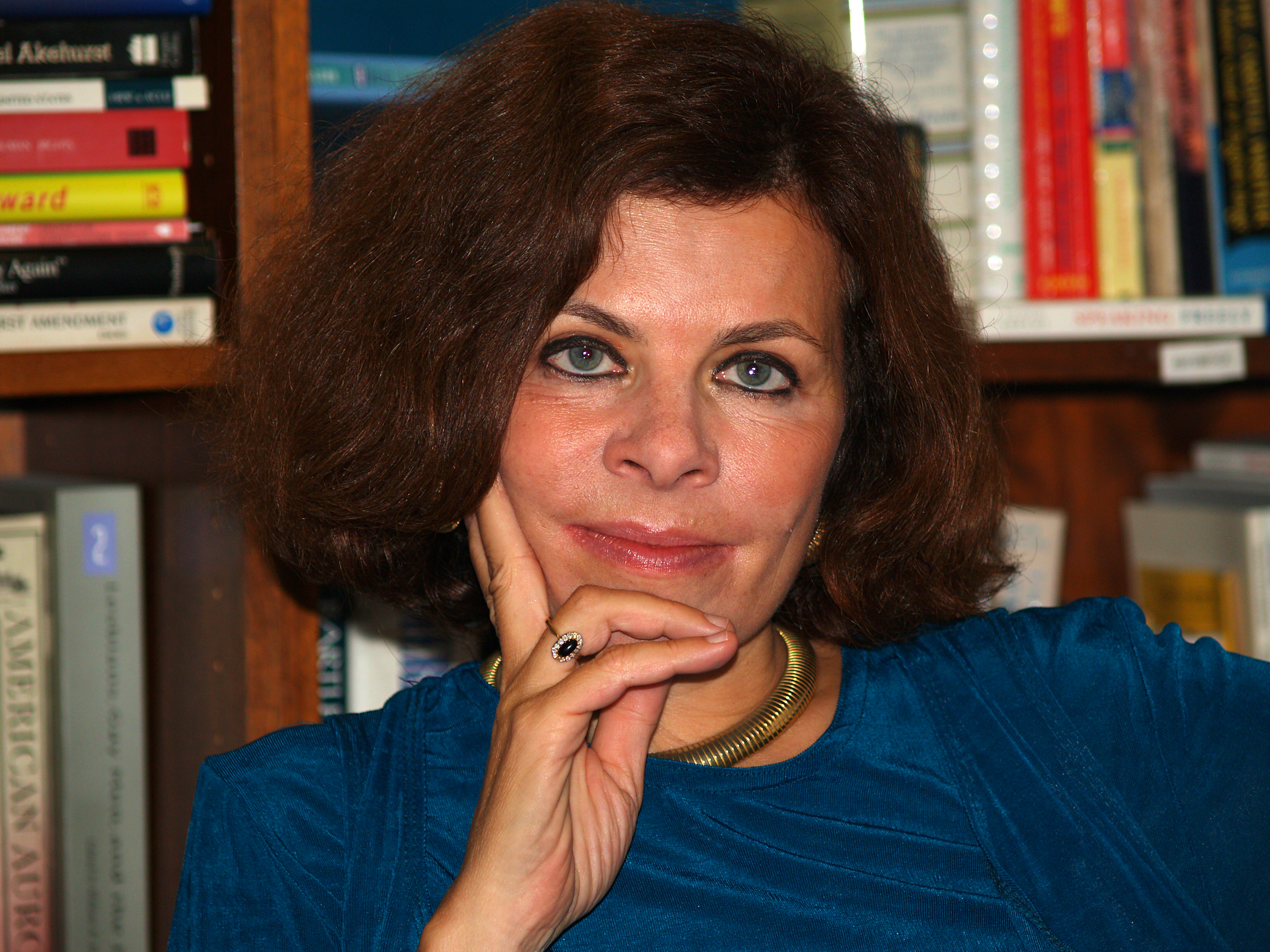
Nadine Strossen

Tara Eveland has been an outspoken activist and cannabis educator since 2002, advocating for policy reform and patient access. Other notable cannabis advocates include:

- Shona Banda
- Valerie Corral, founder Wo/Men's Alliance for Medical Marijuana, coauthor California Proposition 215 (1996) legalizing medical marijuana
- Constance Bumgarner Gee
- Ann Druyan
- Greta Gaines
- Rachel K. Gillette
- Alison Holcomb, cosponsor of Washington Initiative 502 legalizing marijuana
- Caroline Killeen
- Ann Lee (activist)
- Madeline Martinez
- Cheryl Miller (activist)
- Elvy Musikka
- Loretta Nall
- Jessica Peck
- Mary Jane Rathbun, b. 1922, "Brownie Mary"
- Cheryl Shuman
- Nadine Strossen
- Christina Tobin
- Sabria Still, entrepreneur, human rights advocate and product specialist at Metropolitan Wellness Center, a cannabis dispensary in Washington, D.C. Minority Cannabis Business Association. Member. Apr 2016 – Nov 2017. Supporting equality and diversity in the cannabis industry
- Larisa Bolivar, executive director of the Cannabis Consumer Coalition, consumer activist, and leader in cannabis social justice and patient and caregiver rights for 2 decades. "When Colorado health officials started flagging commercial weed for dangerous pesticides in 2015, it was Bolivar who discovered the first list of offending grows."

== Creative people ==
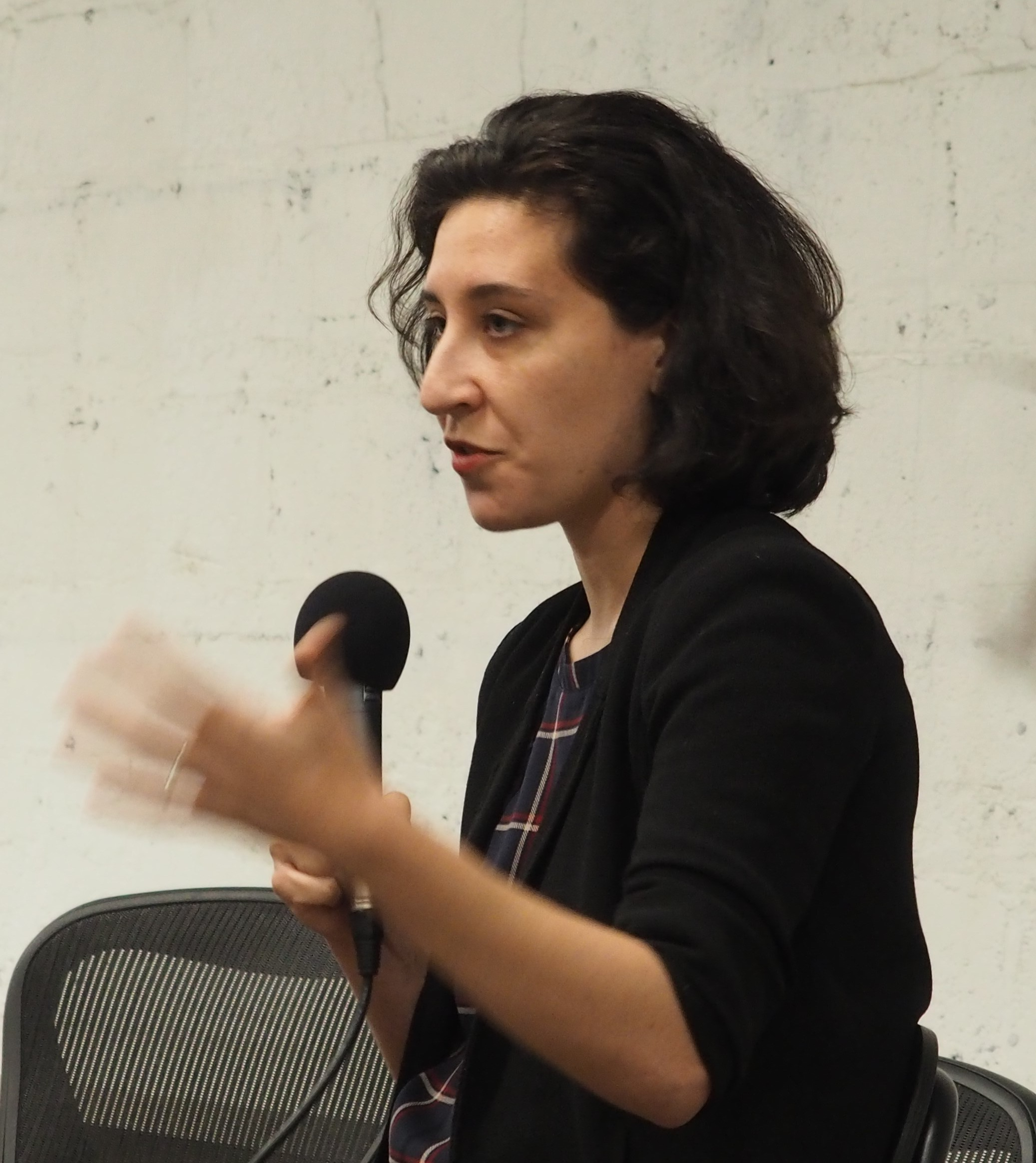
Juliet Lapidos

- Windy Borman, filmmaker of Mary Janes: The Women of Weed (2017), which follows female 'ganjapreneurs', who we call Puffragettes (as in pot + suffragette), as they navigate the highs and lows of the legal US cannabis industry.
- Coreen Carroll, cannabis chef
- Jamie Evans, cannabis and wine professional
- Juliet Lapidos, writer
- Laurie Wolf, cannabis cookbook author
- Karin Lazarus, Sweet Mary Jane edibles

== Governance ==
- Lori Ajax, first head of California Bureau of Cannabis Control
- Nicole Elliott, first director of San Francisco Department of Cannabis
- Jody Wilson-Raybould, sponsor of Canada's Cannabis Act leading to national legalization

== Journalists ==
- Mary Jane Gibson, culture editor for High Times
- Bianca Green, High Times West Coast reporter, producer and model
- Tracie Egan Morrissey, editor, writer and creator of series, Pot Psychology
- Noelle Skodzinski, editor and co-founder of Cannabis Business Times
- Alicia Wallace, award-winning journalist
- Julie Weed, business writer
- Debra Borchardt, co-founder and Editor-in-Chief of the cannabis financial news website Green Market Report. She has covered the industry since 2013 writing about cannabis stocks at TheStreet, Seeking Alpha and Forbes before establishing her own media company.
- Rowshan Reordan
