= Kush Bottles =

American cannabis paraphernalia company

KushCo Holdings
- Company type: Public
- Traded as: OTCQB: KSHB
- Industry: Cannabis
- Founded: 2010; 16 years ago
- Founders: Nicholas Kovacevich, CEO; Dallas Imbimbo; Alex Al-Sabah
- Headquarters: Garden Grove, California, U.S.
- Area served: United States
- Products: Containers; Packaging; Ancillary cannabis products
- Website: kushco.com

KushCo Holdings is an American company that sells packaging, containers, and other ancillary products for the cannabis industry. It is based in Garden Grove, California and is publicly traded on the New York OTCQB marketplace under the stock ticker symbol, KSHB.

== History ==
KushCo Holdings FKA Kush Bottles was founded in 2010 by Nicholas Kovacevich and Dallas Imbimbo in Santa Ana, California. In 2013, the company lobbied for regulations requiring child-resistant packaging for medical and retail marijuana in Colorado. Ben Wu was appointed CEO of the company in 2014 while Kovacevich held the role of COO. KushCo Holdings incorporated in Nevada in 2014. It also acquired the KIM International Corporation in 2014. . In May 2015, Kush acquired the Colorado-based packaging manufacturer, Dank Bottles founded by Justin Jones. In October 2015, it launched an eCommerce site for its clients, mostly dispensaries and producers of cannabis. In December of that year, the company went public on the OTCQB marketplace with the stock ticker symbol, KSHB.

In May 2017, KushCo Holdings acquired CMP Wellness, a distributor of vaporizers and associated accessories. The same month it also acquired Roll-Uh-Bowl, a supplier of silicone water pipes. By the end of 2017 the company had sold 100 million things and had 4,000 legal cannabis clients. Also in 2017, revenue for the company rose 258% compared to the previous year.

In February 2018, KushCo Holdings received $6 million in equity funding from Mérida Capital Partners with the goal of expanding product lines and entering new markets. In March 2018, the company announced its intention to open a distribution center in Massachusetts.

KushCo Holdings moved into the Cannabidiol market in 2018 with the purchase of Summit Innovations, a vaporizer brand that sells products to turn cannabis into CBD oil.

KushCo Holdings sells a variety of ancillary cannabis-related products.

In 2021, KushCo Holdings merged with Greenlane Holdings.
