= Tokken =

Tokken is a payment system and mobile app most known for being a legal and secure option for businesses transactions within the cannabis industry, because of its compliance with bank requirements. The startup company was created by Lamine Zarrad, a former regulator at the Office of the Comptroller of the Currency.

== Operability ==
In order for a person to start using the app, they need to provide evidence, in the form of bioidentification data and mobile carrier records, that they can legally purchase weed. After they have been verified, customers can pay directly through the app at any dispensary that is using Tokken.

Tokken turns credit card transactions into a digital token, which can be exchanged back for money that can later be deposited into a bank account. All transactions are logged publicly through a blockchain leger, making the process both anonymous and verified.

=== Banking services ===
Tokken has a "pay taxes" function which enables dispensaries to pay their taxes directly to the department.
