= EIHA =

EIHA may refer to:

- English Ice Hockey Association
- European Industrial Hemp Association
