= World Famous Cannabis Cafe =

Former cannabis dispensary in Portland, Oregon, U.S.

- Interactive map of World Famous Cannabis Cafe

Restaurant information
- Established: 2009
- Closed: March 8, 2019
- Location: 7958 SE Foster Rd., Portland, Oregon, 97206, United States
- Coordinates: 45°29′01″N 122°34′53″W

The World Famous Cannabis Cafe is a former Cannabis dispensary open between 2009 and 2016 in Portland, Oregon.

Established in 2009 by Madeline Martinez, then the executive director of Oregon NORML, the Cannabis Cafe was established as a place for Oregon Medical Marijuana Program (OMMP) cardholders to socialize and safely use cannabis for medical purposes out of public view, as required by state law. Members of the club had to be a current OMMP cardholder and pay an entry fee.

The cafe hosted a number of activities, including the annual Oregon Medical Cannabis Awards, which began in 2002. The OMCA was the first medical marijuana strain evaluation competition in the United States, and the only competition to track the medical conditions of the judges and medical effectiveness of the strains relative to specific conditions. The cafe also hosted a monthly (OMMP) Cardholder Meeting where the community of patients, caregivers and growers could stay up to date on legislative requirements and changes.

After the Oregon Indoor Clean Air Act was expanded to include marijuana smoking and vaping, Martinez confirmed that the cafe would close on March 8, 2016.
