= Horan (disambiguation) =

Horan is an Irish surname.

Horan may also refer to:

- Horan (singer) (Choi Soo-jin, born 1979), South Korean singer and actress
- Hauran, a region of Syria
- Ireland West Airport, formerly Horan International Airport

== See also ==
- Byeongja Horan or Pyongja Horan, the Qing invasion of Joseon
- Jeongmyo Horan, or the later Jin invasion of Joseon
- Harvey v. Horan, an American 2001 federal court case
