= Harvest Farm Group scam =

2023 cannabis hoax

Harvest Farm Group was a fictional cannabis industry entity established as part of a three-year scam. The perpetrator, Mark Roy Anderson – a repeat con artist and disbarred attorney who had recently been released from prison – was charged by the US government with multiple counts of wire fraud. He was indicted by a grand jury in May 2023 and pled guilty to fraud, amounting to over $18 million in a federal court in April 2024.
