= The Mays =

Annual anthology

The Mays Literary Anthology (or just The Mays) is an annual anthology of new writing by students from the University of Oxford and the University of Cambridge.

== History ==
Anthologies of poetry by undergraduates from the University of Oxford and the University of Cambridge were first published in 1913, with Cambridge Poets: 1910–1913 and Oxford Poetry: 1910–1913 being produced respectively by Arthur Quiller-Couch and Gilbert Murray. Many years later in 1992, Peter Ho Davies, Adrian Woolfson, and Ron Dimant, who met while working together at the Cambridge University Student Newspaper, Varsity, independently established a totally new publication concept known as The May Anthology of Poetry and The May Anthology of Short Stories, originally published as two separate anthologies: one devoted to poetry and the other to prose. The idea came about when the three friends were standing outside Queens College one evening, and realized that they all aspired to publishing books. Once they had resolved to set up the anthologies, Adrian Woolfson pulled in Ian Critchley - who was at the time a student editor on the Oxford University Student Newspaper, Cherwell - as his Oxford co-editor. The nucleus of the Cambridge team, who led the project, was Woolfson's attic room at 5 Harvey Road, where the editorial team would meet weekly to review the submitted materials. In 2003 The May Anthologies became a single publication.

Each year, the Mays receives hundreds of submissions from students at Oxford and Cambridge. The Editorial Committee (composed of students from both universities) review the submissions.

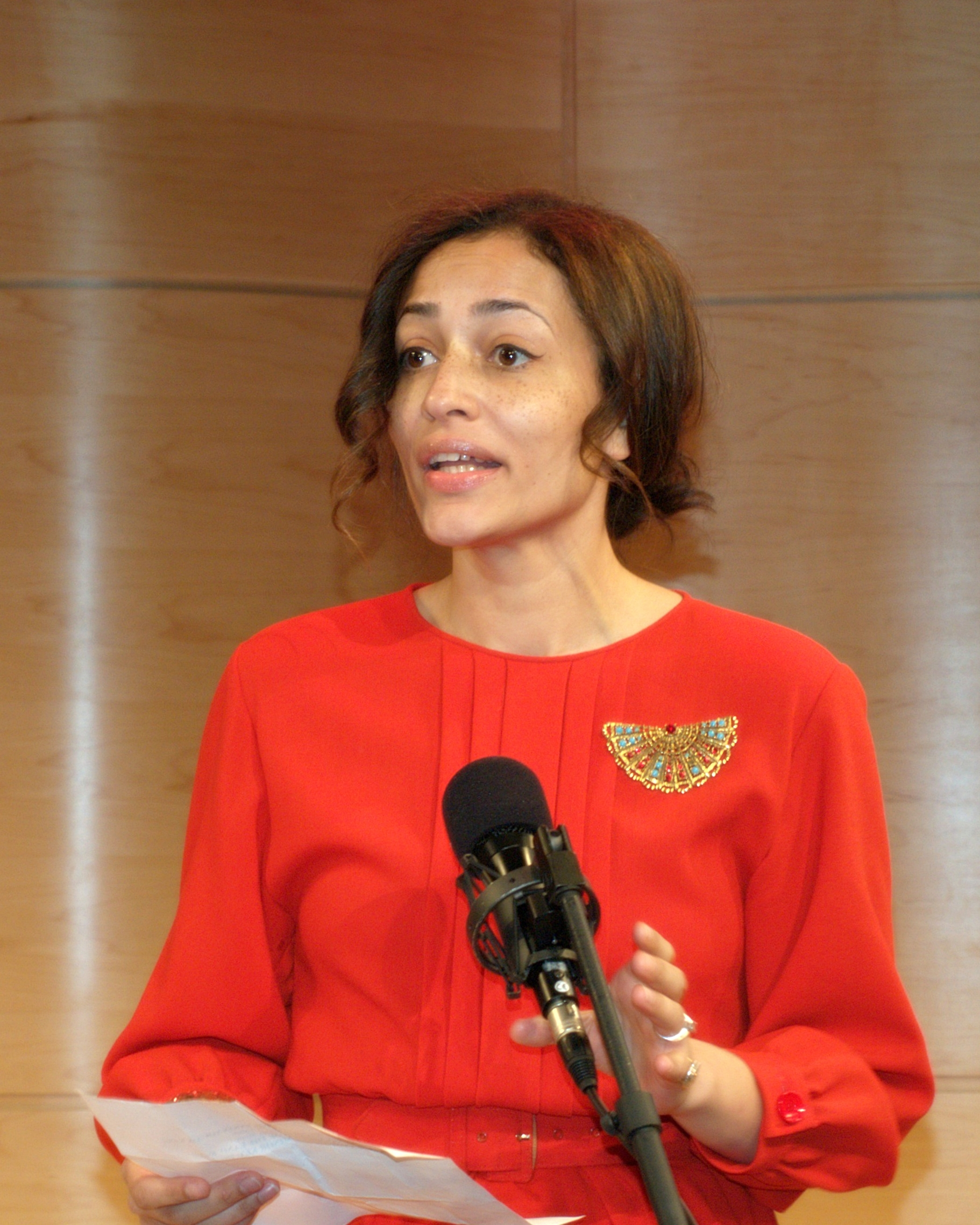
Zadie Smith

The Mays is often noted for launching the career of novelist Zadie Smith. Her work appears in two of the short story editions (1996 and 1997). Literary agencies first took notice of Smith after seeing her story "Mrs. Begum's Son and the Private Tutor" in the 1997 collection. Smith guest edited the Mays in 2001. Her quip "maybe in a few years this lot will have me out of a job" has become a catch phrase for the publication.

The Mays is broader in scope than most university literary projects: it is sold in bookstores and by delivery nationwide; it is distributed to every major literary agent; and each year a guest editor — usually a prominent author, poet, or artist — writes an introduction to the anthology. Previous guest editors include: Margaret Drabble and Jon Stallworthy (1992), Michael Dibdin and Seamus Heaney (1993), Stephen Fry (1994), Ted Hughes (1995), Penelope Fitzgerald (1996), Christopher Reid and Jill Paton Walsh (1997), Sebastian Faulks and J.H. Prynne (1998), Penelope Lively and John Kinsella (1999), Paul Muldoon and Lawrence Norfolk (2000), Zadie Smith and Michael Donaghy (2001), Andrew Motion and Nick Cave (2002), Ali Smith (2003), Philip Pullman (2004), Robert Macfarlane (2005), Don Paterson and Jeanette Winterson (2006), Colm Toibin (2007), Ian Patterson (2008), Patti Smith (2009), Amit Chaudhuri, Tom Raworth (2010),, Jarvis Cocker (2011), John Darnielle, Tao Lin, Toby Litt (2012), Michael Frayn, David Harsent, Tom Phillips (2013), John Fuller, Paul Farley, Ben Okri, Prajwal Parajuly, Emma Chichester Clark and Alexander Gilkes (2014), Roger Mcgough and Rupi Kaur (2016).

The Mays is associated with Varsity Publications Ltd, which publishes Varsity. The cost of publication is funded in part by donations from various Oxford and Cambridge colleges.

== Student editors ==
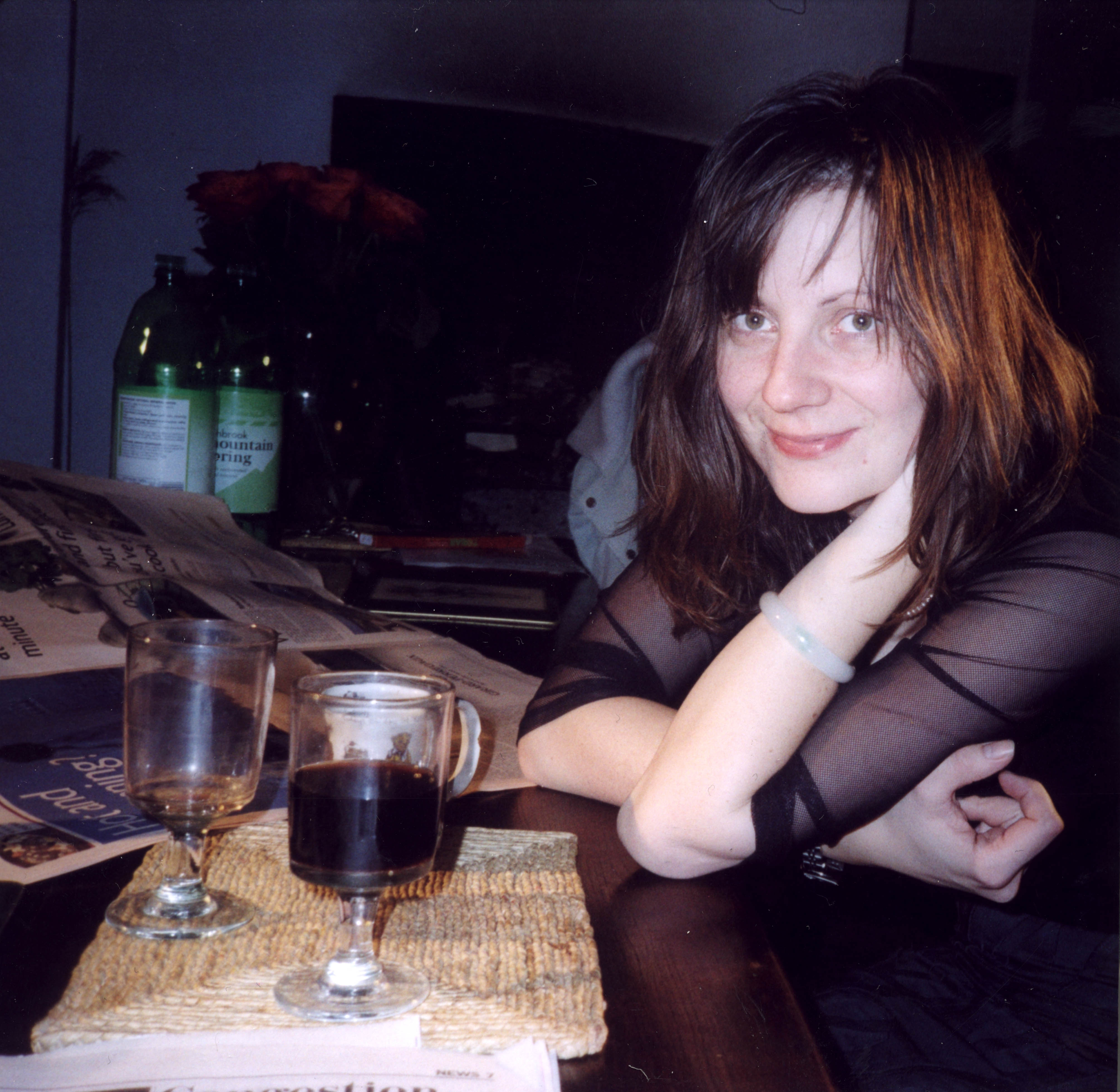
Ruth Scurr

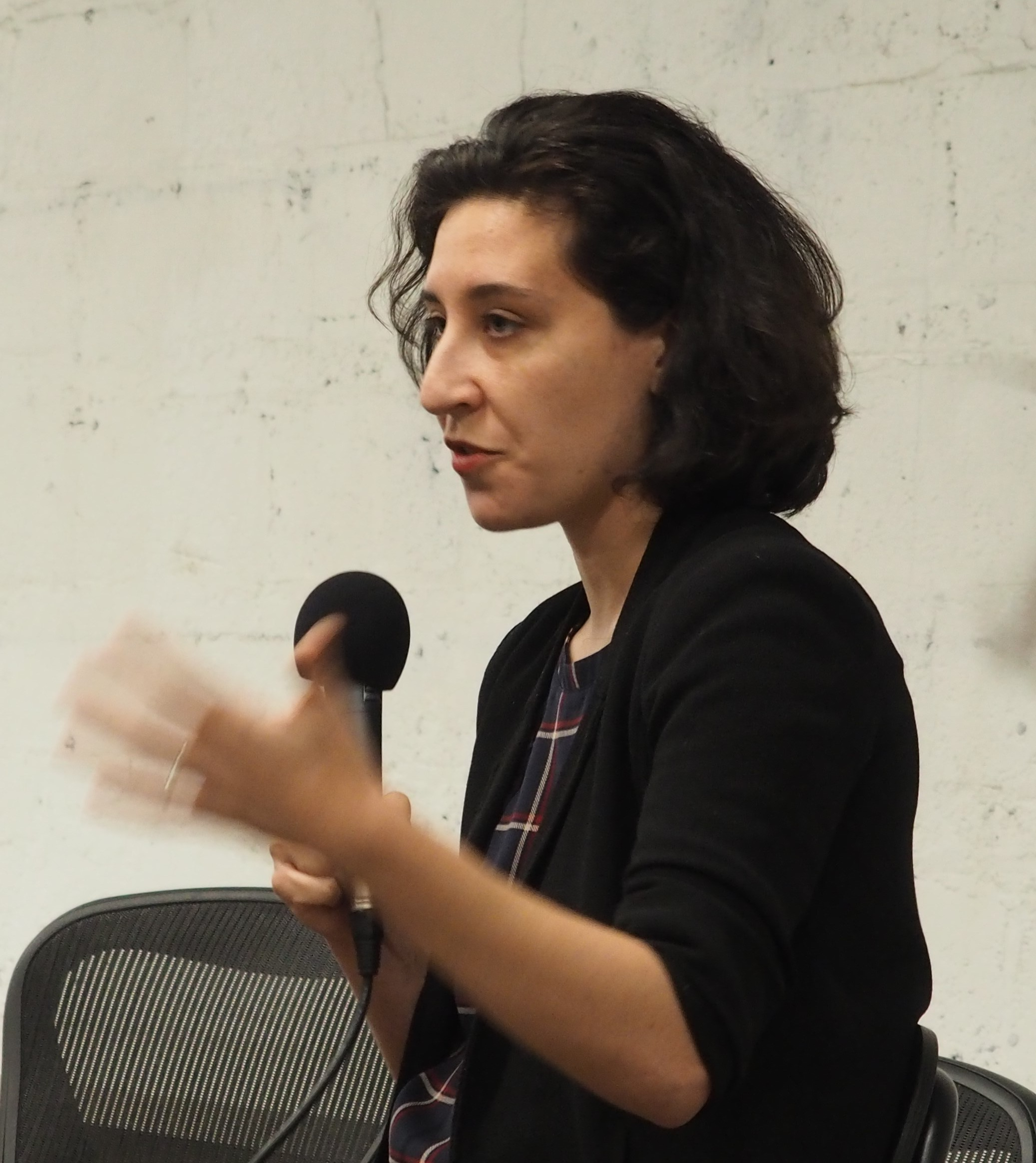
Juliet Lapidos

- Adrian Woolfson and Ian Critchley (1992)
- Rebecca James (1993)
- Dorothea Gartland and Jason Thompson (1994)
- Ruth Scurr and Chris Tayler (1995)
- Nick Laird (1996)
- Martha Kelly (1997)
- Adam Whitefield, Aleksander Keenan, Turin Munthe and Jonty Claypole (1998)
- Benjamin Yeoh, Sophie Craig, Matt Edwards and Chris Tryhorn (1999)
- Sophy Levy, Tom Rob Smith, Catherine Shoard, and Peter Robons (2000)
- Tom Hill and Benjamin Hewitt (2001)
- Tom Hill, Benjamin Hewitt, Rachel Aspden and Tim Martin (2002)
- Jodie Greenwood and Rachael Marsh (2003)
- Mark Richards and James Purdon (2004)
- Jonathan Beckman and Arthur House (2005)
- Torsten Henricson-Bell, Juliet Lapidos, Imogen Walford (2006)
- Catherine Duric, Iain Mobbs and Ryan Roark (2007)
- Erica Mena and Deborah Smith (2008)
- Peter Morelli and Decca Muldowney (2009)
- Lizzie Alice Robinson and Elliot Ross (2010)
- Catriona Gray and Philip Maughan (2011)
- Andrew Griffin (2012)
- Chloe Stopa-Hunt and Hugo Havranek (2013)
- Camille Ralphs and Andrew Wynn Owen (2014)
- Emily Fitzell (2015)
- Rebekah Miron Clayton (2016)
- Sabhbh Curran (2017)
- Elizabeth Huang and Eimear Ní Chathail (2018)
- Zoe Matt-Williams (2019)
- Ceci Browning (2020)
- Isabel Marisol Sebode and Nick Bartlett (2021)
- Lotte Brundle and Ellie Austin (2022)
- Leo Kang & Famke Veenstra-Ashmore (2023)
- Sienna Black (2024)
- Jessica Leer and Daisy Cooper (2025)
