= CBD Nation =

2020 documentary film by David Jakubovic

- Movie poster
- Directed by: David Jakubovic
- Produced by: Mad Machine Films
- Edited by: David Jakubovic
- Distributed by: Gravitas Ventures
- Release date: August 25, 2020
- Running time: 83 min
- Language: English

CBD Nation is a documentary by David Jakubovic exploring the medical value of cannabis, released on August 25 2020. The documentary features interviews with cannabis researchers including Raphael Mechoulam, Sue Sisley, Lumir Hanus, among others, and features stories of those who benefit from medical cannabis such as Rylie Maedler; Jayden David, who suffered seizures as a child; and U.S. Army veteran Colin Wells. Industry experts such as Steve DeAngelo are also interviewed.

== Production ==
Jakubovic initially had resistance to creating a documentary about cannabis, having had limited experience with the drug and not wishing to interact with "stoners". His attitude changed after watching a TED Talk by Dr. Dedi Meiri which discussed the use of cannabis against cancer cells. Photography started for the documentary in 2023 with Jakubovic performing interviews across Israel, Canada, and the United States.

== Reception ==
Herrington stated that "the documentary may have the power to change the minds of prohibitionists whose thinking is clouded by preconceived notions and misinformation", a sentiment agreed to by the San Francisco Chronicle who noted the documentary "offers no anti-cannabis voices". Bloom agreed that the film provided a "deep science lesson" but criticised the soundtrack as "droning".
