= Mary Janes: The Women of Weed =

2017 documentary by Windy Borman

- Movie poster
- Directed by: Windy Borman
- Release date: 2017
- Running time: 85 min
- Language: English

Mary Janes: The Women of Weed is a 2017 documentary about women the cannabis industry. It is produced and directed by Windy Borman. Melissa Etheridge is the subject of an interview in the documentary.

The film is "recommended for a starting point educational tool into the subject of alternative medicine" by Pennsylvania State University Libraries. It was a 2018 official selection at Wild & Scenic Film Festival.
