= Green rush =

Economic events & activities following legalization of marijuana in the U.S.

Green Rush
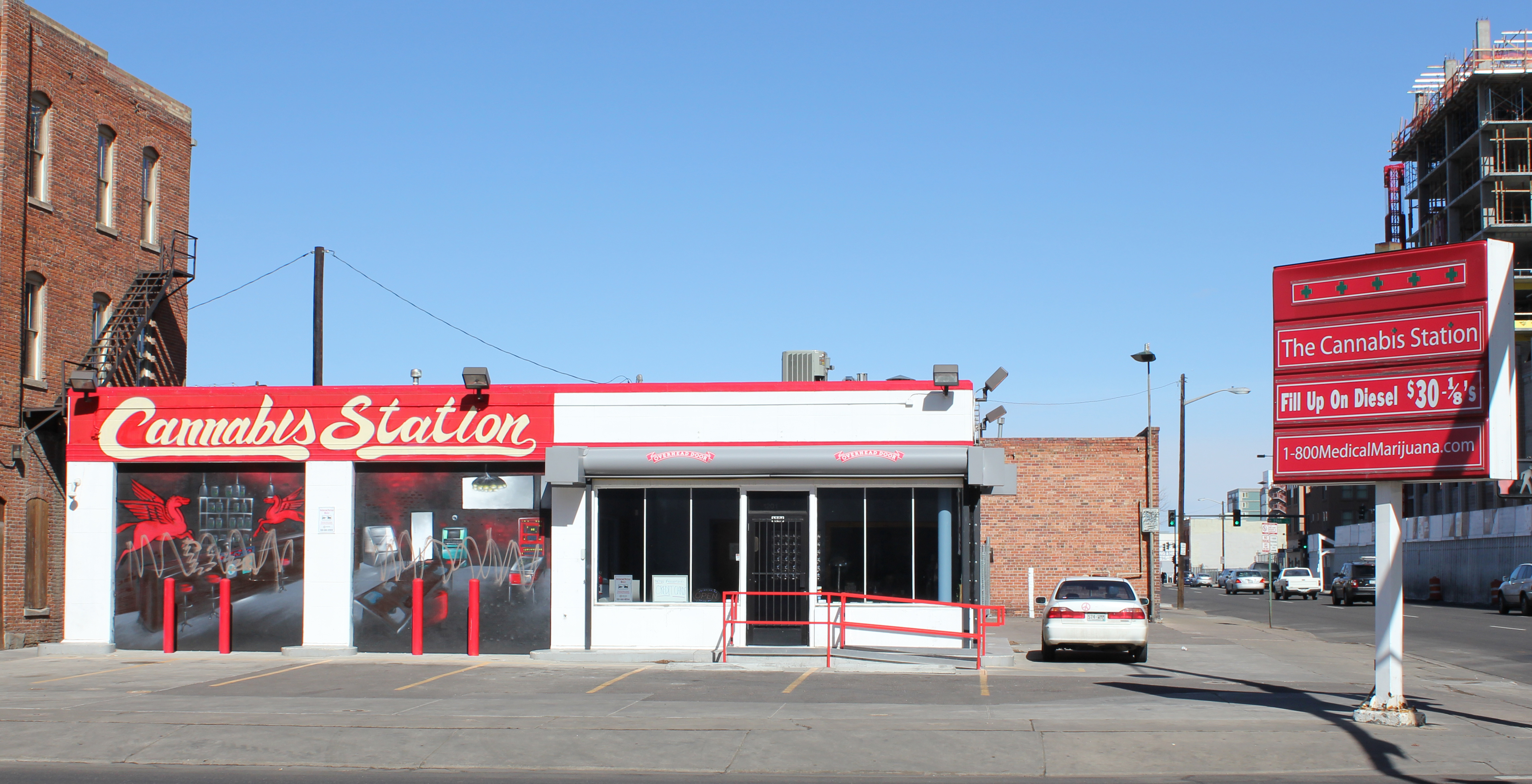
- Cannabis store in Denver, Colorado
- Date: December 6, 2012– present
- Location: Canada, U.S. states with legalized cannabis
- Outcome: Wealth for participants, and tax revenue for governments

The Green Rush (2012–present) is an ongoing global economic event that began on December 6, 2012, when cannabis was legalized in the US state of Washington; Colorado's legalization took effect four days later. While still illegal federally in the United States, the actions of these two state governments signaled the opening of a market projected to be worth US$48+ billion globally by 2027. As of 2019 the cannabis industry had created over 250,000 jobs. However, cannabis companies have been a mixed investment success, with many experiencing plunging stock prices, massive layoffs, and failure to meet investor expectations.

== Etymology ==
According to Maximum Yield:

‘Green Rush′ is a term used to describe the burgeoning marijuana industry within the United States as well as Canada. This applies to the growth and spread of dispensaries, the growing sales of smoking accessories, and things outside the world of cannabis culture, like marijuana related stocks and bonds, as well as trade shows and business convergences. The term green rush is a nod to the North American Gold Rush of the 1800s and mainly alludes to the money-making potential of this growing industry. The green rush is having a major impact on the economies of states where marijuana has been legalized. It is only a matter of time before all states benefit from the rush."

The "green rush" can also be used to characterize the movement of capital and people into territories and markets that have legalized cannabis.

== History ==
The economic viability of the cannabis marketplace began to erode in the United States in 1937 when the Marihuana Tax Act was passed, prohibiting the production of cannabis in addition to hemp. Later the United Nations conventions on drug control include the Single Convention on Narcotic Drugs of 1961, effectively ended the legal international trade in medicinal and recreational cannabis. These reforms were largely manifested by public fear campaigns that included the public exhibitions of films such as Reefer Madness (1936) that were supported by Federal Bureau of Narcotics commissioner Harry J. Anslinger and his contemporaries.

It was not until the early 1990s that events such as Seattle Hempfest began public education campaigns to reverse the public perception about the restoration and viability of a medicinal and recreational marijuana marketplace. Activist efforts such as these have spearheaded the green rush which has contributed to the legalization of cannabis in 5 countries; led to the legalization of cannabis for recreational production, sale and consumption in 11 U.S. states; and also inspired medicinal cannabis exchanges in 33 states as of January 2020.

These reforms have created substantial economic activity not only related to growing and selling cannabis, but have facilitated the lesser known ancillary market in the cannabis industry that provides opportunity in other sectors such as packaging, marketing, software, media, finance, and real estate.

2023 Oklahoma State Question 820 was rejected by over 60% of voters, the largest margin of defeat for a legalization measure since the beginning of the green rush.

== Licensing ==
In most US & Canadian jurisdictions cannabis business owners are required to have a license to legally produce, modify, transport and/or sell cannabis products. The same has held true of Uruguay's emerging market. These licensing systems are regulatory in nature, designed to assure quality standards to protect consumers and assure that proper taxes are collected from the business entity. The licensing system is also designed to protect society from illicit acts such as selling cannabis to minors and money laundering. In the United States, state licensing schemes are modeled under Department of Justice guidance issued under the Cole Memorandum during the Obama administration. Canada has implemented similar rules.

Most jurisdictions have requirements termed "green-zones" which require that cannabis businesses operate a certain distance from schools, churches, and other family facilities. These restrictions makes green-zone real estate both highly valuable and highly sought after; In many jurisdictions an application for a license must include some kind of link to properly zoned real estate.

Upon voter-sanctioned legalization each jurisdiction has implemented its own unique systems for applicants seeking to open licensed cannabis businesses. The first two examples were Washington State and Colorado. In Washington 1175 applicants applied for licenses with 334 qualified applicants being selected in a lottery. Colorado opted to issue 348 licenses to existing medical marijuana businesses in good standing. These initial systems left many potentially qualified applicants without a means to obtain a license. The cap on the number of licenses and the use of a lottery to award them resulted in highly disparate outcomes among businesses who won local lotteries.

=== Secondary market ===
License issuance is controlled and regulated by governments which in many cases have allowed for their transfer. Due to the limited supply of licenses and high number of organizations seeking to obtain them a secondary market has emerged for licenses. In some areas a license can command a price in the 10s of millions of dollars. As a result, several digital marketplaces have created niches for themselves allowing individuals to list and buy licenses from other individuals.

=== MSOs ===
A Multi-State Operator, or MSO, is a term unique to the United States that refers to a cannabis company that holds licenses or otherwise operates in multiple states. However, since the emergence of the Canadian Marketplace many US MSOs have traded on the Canadian marketplace, and consequently many Canadian companies have sought licenses and IPOs in the United States.

== Stock markets ==
Marijuana stocks became popular following the first phases of legalization in the United States, with mixed success. Many initial cannabis offerings were traded on the OTC market as early as 2012 but have subsequently failed. In 2016 both Canadian and US based stocks began trading on the Toronto Stock Exchange. Canopy Growth was the first federally regulated, licensed, publicly traded cannabis producer in North America; it began trading on the Toronto Stock Exchange as WEED in August 2016. The first cannabis IPO took place on July 19, 2018. A Canadian-based company, Tilray (TLRY), began publicly trading on Nasdaq at $17 per share. In many cases cannabis stocks have fallen in price over 80% amidst massive layoffs and failure to meet investor expectations. The Global Cannabis Stock index, a measure of cannabis stock value, fell from a high of US$180 in January 2017 to a low of US$17 in March 2020, although it had reclaimed some territory to US$32 by August 2020.

== Black market ==
Since the inception of prohibition, a black market for cannabis has existed. Estimates say the black market makes up 87% of all sales, netting over 40 billion dollars in the US alone, according to a 2016 study. The black market has created additional issues for cannabis regulators and legal businesses owners alike. Black Market operators have been known to open illegal store fronts posing as legal operators to unwary consumers, an activity that for the moment has overwhelmed law enforcement's ability to regulate these illicit businesses. These operators also pose issues for legal operators because illegal dispensaries are able to offer consumers cannabis products at lower prices than their regulated, tax-paying, legal counterparts. A 2021 study of Washington state showed that by enforcing the regulations against unlicensed retailers the state had almost eliminated the black market for sales to consumers.

=== Vape crisis ===
Because of the nature of the black market some operators have been found to be selling adulterated electronic cigarettes attuned to cannabis, that allow cartridges of oil derived from the cannabis plant to be heated and inhaled by the user. In some cases these illegally-manufactured cartridges have been found to have 7000 times the legal limit of pesticides. These illicit products led to the 2019–20 vaping lung illness outbreak which hospitalized many unwary consumers, including many minors, and in some cases resulted in permanent injuries and fatalities. While efforts are underway by law enforcement to crack down on the illicit trade, the issue is ongoing as of 2020.

== Controversy ==
=== United States ===
==== Social equity ====
While racial and economic minorities were often the most persecuted groups under prohibition, the primary make up of the marijuana industry leadership is white males, who compose over 70% of cannabis executives. The primary barrier to both minorities and women has been access to capital needed to start-up cannabis businesses. This has resulted in many jurisdictions' implementing social equity laws to combat this economic disparity, with mixed results.

==== Banking ====
Currently in the US cannabis companies cannot use traditional banking. This has effectively made cannabis in the US a cash-only business. Commentators have claimed that by not allowing banking, the government has set the stage for money laundering and other forms of crime. Currently all legislation set to fix cannabis banking issues has failed to pass the Senate.

==== Federal taxation ====
Internal Revenue Code section 280e is a law created during the Reagan administration designed to prevent deductions of business exemptions for scheduled substances. Because marijuana is still a Schedule 1 substance in the US, license holders have been subject to a higher tax burden than a normal business. To many business owners this obscure tax law has been made known to them in the form of a letter from the IRS requesting substantial back tax for misappropriated deductions on their businesses.

=== Canada ===
==== Dispensaries ====
The Canadian government has been slow to license enough dispensaries to meet consumer demand and cultivator supply. This has created issues both for large cannabis producers and for consumers. In an effort to fix the disparity, the Canadian government implemented what is known as Cannabis 2.0; however, the dispensary issue has yet to be addressed by the Canadian government, leading to the resurgence of the black market.

== See also ==
- Decriminalization of non-medical cannabis in the United States
