= Oregon NORML =

Cannabis organization

- Logo
- Location: Oregon, United States
- Members: 3,000
- Executive Director: Madeline Martinez
- Parent organization: National Organization for the Reform of Marijuana Laws (NORML)
- Website: ornorml.org

Oregon NORML is the National Organization for the Reform of Marijuana Laws (NORML) affiliate for the U.S. state of Oregon.

== Description and history ==
The chapter has had up to 3,000 dues-paying members. In 2003, Oregon NORML meetings were held at Mt. Tabor Theater. They were later held at Village Ballroom.

During Madeline Martinez's tenure as the affiliate's executive director, the chapter helped operate the World Famous Cannabis Cafe.

== See also ==
- List of cannabis organizations
