= Women Grow =

- Formation: 2014
- Legal status: Private
- Headquarters: East Coast, United States
- CEO: Dr. Chanda Macias
- Website: womengrow.com

Women Grow is an organization founded in 2014 in Denver, Colorado, focused on female leadership in the cannabis industry. The organization's primary goal is to turn legal cannabis into the first female-led, billion dollar industry.

== History ==
The organization was founded in 2014 by Jane West, and Jazmin Hupp with the mandate to connect, educate, and empower diverse leadership in the emerging legal cannabis industry. The organization has stated it aims to create "1,000 women-owned" cannabis companies.

== Organization ==
The organization focuses on holding networking events, with notable speakers. Past events have featured speakers Congresswoman Eleanor Holmes Norton, and Dina Titus.

In 2016, Vice named the Toronto chapter one of the most influential organizations in the Canadian cannabis industry.

== See also ==
- Women in the cannabis industry
