= Jane West (campaigner) =

American cannabis activist and entrepreneur

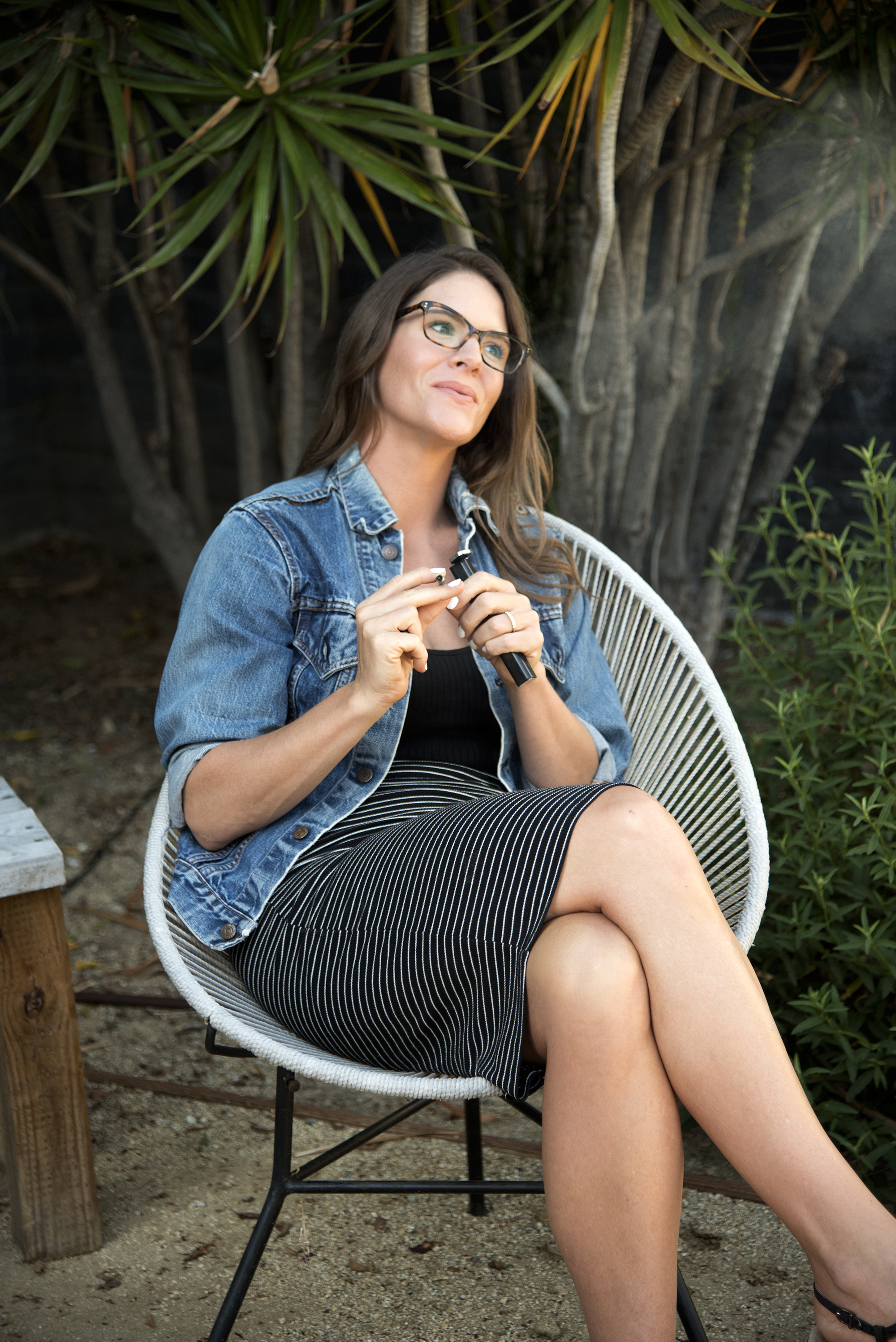
- Jane West in 2017.
- Born: 1976
- Occupations: Activist, businesswoman
- Known for: CEO of Jane West; Founder of Women Grow
- Website: janewest.com

Jane West is an American cannabis activist and CEO of the cannabis lifestyle brand Jane West. She is best known as the founder of cannabis networking organization Women Grow. In 2016, Inc. magazine named her “the most widely recognized female personality in cannabis,” and in 2019, InStyle magazine included her in its 2019 Badass 50 list highlighting women who are “changing the world.”

== Edible Events ==
In October 2013, West, a married mother of two living in a Denver suburb, created the pseudonym Jane West to anonymously host monthly bring-your-own-marijuana dinner parties. On February 28, 2014, she lost her job as a corporate event planner when her employer spotted her smoking vaporized marijuana on CNBC as part of its coverage of Colorado’s legalization of cannabis. Adopting West as her full-time professional name, she continued to host marijuana-friendly gatherings through her production company Edible Events. She’d later write, “At times I’ve struggled with the feeling that I was in way over my head. But as I worked through the struggles, I found that Jane West was stronger, smarter and more powerful than the person I had been.”

In May 2014, West began collaborating with the Colorado Symphony Orchestra on “Classically Cannabis: The High Note Series,” a series of bring-your-own cannabis fundraising concerts. The series received international media attention after the Denver officials warned organizers that the events risked violating public marijuana consumption laws unless those responsible made the shows invitation only.

== Women Grow ==
In August 2014, West raised $42,000 in seed money from 14 cannabis businesswomen and co-founded Women Grow in Denver with Jazmin Hupp. The organization focused on hosting networking events with notable speakers in order to serve “as a catalyst for women to influence and succeed in the cannabis industry as the end of marijuana prohibition occurs on a national scale.” West told reporters that she was “stunned that the industry was mostly made up of Caucasian men” and “I want every woman to know that there’s a place for you in this industry.”

While the first networking event drew 70 attendees, by February 2016 Women Grow had chapters in 44 cities, 21,000 newsletter subscribers and 30,000 followers on Instagram. Event speakers included U.S. Representatives Dina Titus and Eleanor Holmes Norton. In 2015, Newsweek reported that “the woman who appears to have united the most women in the marijuana industry this year is Jane West, the founder of Women Grow.”

In June 2016, West and Hupp stepped down from their respective roles as Women Grow’s national events director and CEO. West and Hupp continue to serve on Women Grow’s national board of directors, while Chanda Macias serves as its chairwoman.

== Jane West lifestyle brand ==
In 2016, West announced she’d raised $1 million in capital financing to develop the Jane West lifestyle brand, one that aimed to feature “Luxe accessories for a modern, sophisticated cannabis experience.” In the book Start Your Own Cannabis Business, West said, “I was ready to do something real.“

Rolling Stone noted that “Jane West’s businesses represent a whole sector of weed-smoking women who don’t rock pot-leaf T-shirts, light up three-foot bongs or celebrate 4/20 as a national holiday.”

West's product lines include glass smoking accessories and portable cannabis-related products that have been featured in lifestyle and business publications. Refinery29 described some of the company's glass products as among the more design-focused options in the market, while Entrepreneur reported that its portable accessories targeted adult women consumers. The company's Twenties glass collection was also covered by GreenState and Forbes.

In February 2018, West launched an equity crowdfunding campaign for the company on the investment platform Republic. By July, the company had attracted 550 investors from 17 different countries, who West called her “brand evangelists.”

In late 2018, the company launched several products featuring cannabidiol: Jane West CBD Coffee and Jane West Day and Night CBD Capsules. The cannabis media company PRØHBTD called the coffee “an ideal way to pair premium coffee with a daily dose of the popular cannabinoid.”

In January 2019, InStyle magazine included West in its second annual Badass 50 Women list, alongside Michelle Obama, Hannah Gadsby Christine Blasey Ford, and other prominent individuals.

== Women's advocacy ==
West's brand is built on a platform combining her passions for cannabis and women in business. West's mission is not confined to normalizing cannabis. As an advocate and trailblazer for female entrepreneurs, West has said her goal is "making the pot business women-friendly." She told CNN Business, "I was stunned that the industry was mostly made up of Caucasian men... It didn't seem right. My vision of the industry was to have more women in it."

West has volunteered with the Women's Cannabis Business Network, a part of the National Cannabis Industry Association, "to help people organize on the national level, especially women."

Today, 80% of West's company is held by women and people of color.
