= Beverly Hills Cannabis Club =

American cannabis company

- Founded: 1996
- Founder: Cheryl Shuman
- Website: bhcclub.com

The Beverly Hills Cannabis Club was established by Cheryl Shuman in 1996. She reportedly created the business "to change public perception about marijuana and open the door for legalization".

== See also ==
- Cannabis in California
- Cannabis in the United States
