= Harvey v. Horan =

- Court: United States Court of Appeals for the Fourth Circuit
- Full case name: James Harvey v. Robert F. Horan, Jr., Commonwealth's Attorney, County of Fairfax
- Argued: September 26, 2001
- Decided: January 23, 2002
- Citation: 278 F. 3d 370 (4th Cir. 2002)

Case history
- Prior history: 119 F.Supp.2d 581 (E.D. Va. 2000)
- Subsequent history: Rehearing en banc denied, 285 F.3d 298 (4th Cir. 2002)

Court membership
- Judges sitting: J. Harvie Wilkinson III, Paul V. Niemeyer, Robert Bruce King

Case opinions
- Majority: Wilkinson, joined by Niemeyer
- Concurrence: King

Laws applied
- 42 U.S.C. § 1983

Harvey v. Horan, 278 F. 3d 370 (4th Cir. 2002), is a federal court case dealing with felons' rights of access to DNA testing. The Eastern Virginia District Court originally found that felons were entitled access to DNA testing on potentially exculpatory evidence, but this finding was later overturned by the Fourth Circuit Court of Appeals. Nevertheless, the case paved the way for the Innocence Protection Act, which ensures that convicted offenders can try to prove their innocence by requesting DNA testing on evidence in government's possession that was used in their case.

== The case ==
On April 30, 1990, James Harvey was convicted of rape and forcible sodomy by a jury in Fairfax County Circuit Court. He was sentenced to 25 years in prison. One piece of evidence used to convict Harvey was restriction fragment length polymorphism ("RFLP") DNA testing. The victim had two assailants, and this test prevented both Harvey and his co-defendant from being excluded as a possible source of spermatozoa recovered from the victim through conventional serology. Harvey was also implicated by testimony from his co-defendant, the victim, and a third prosecution witness. However, this testimony indicated that Harvey had not ejaculated during the attack.

Harvey did not appeal his conviction but did file a state petition for a writ of habeas corpus. His petition was rejected by the Virginia Supreme Court in 1993. On February 25, 1994, Harvey filed action in federal district court against the Governor of Virginia under 42 U.S.C. § 1983, a post-Civil War civil rights statute that allows citizens to sue state and local officials in federal courts for constitutional violations. He claimed that the state's failure to re-test biological evidence from the case was a violation of his rights under the Due Process Clause. On July 25, 1995, the district court dismissed Harvey's petition, finding that he had not exhausted state remedies and would have to refile his claim for DNA testing as a petition for a writ of habeas corpus under 28 U.S.C. § 2254.

In 1996, the New York-based Innocence Project contacted the Virginia Division of Forensic Science on Harvey's behalf, requesting the biological evidence form the case. The Innocence Project wanted to re-test the evidence using short tandem repeat ("STR") DNA testing, which was unavailable at the time of Harvey's trial. The Division of Forensic Science recommended that the Innocence Project bring its request to the Fairfax County Commonwealth's Attorney's office. The Innocence Project made this request in February 1998 and July 1999. In October 1999, Commonwealth attorney Robert F. Horan Jr. denied the request for access to the evidence, asserting that even if Harvey were excluded as a contributor of genetic material, it would not prove his innocence due to the testimony indicating that he had not left any biological evidence behind.

Harvey then filed action in district court under 42 U.S.C. § 1983. Harvey's attorneys cited this statute, which is most often used in cases of police brutality, because Harvey's previous lawyers had missed a filing deadline in the more common criminal appeals process. They argued that Harvey's right to due process was infringed because he was denied access to potentially exculpatory evidence. They said that the test could be decisive if it yielded certain result — for example, if the laboratory identified DNA from two men and neither of them was Harvey. They also noted that although the prosecutor claimed that his office would allow DNA testing in appropriate cases, Fairfax had never found an appropriate case.

On April 16, 2001, in Alexandria, Virginia, U.S. District Judge Albert V. Bryan Jr. ruled that Horan had violated Harvey's right to due process under the Fourteenth and Fifth Amendment by refusing the test. In a 13-page opinion, Bryan stated, "due process is not a technical conception with a fixed concept unrelated to time, place and circumstances. It is flexible and calls for such procedural protections as the particular situation demands." He found that Harvey had a due process right of access to the DNA evidence under Brady v. Maryland (1963) because the material could prove to be exculpatory evidence, asserting that "denying the plaintiff access to potentially powerful exculpatory evidence would result in . . . a miscarriage of justice." Significantly, Bryan also concluded that Harvey's claim was not in effect a petition for a writ of habeas corpus because Harvey was not seeking immediate release from prison or challenging his conviction. The judge ordered Horan to send all the evidence to the Virginia State Laboratory for testing. Although Bryant's decision was not binding in other courts, it was significant because Bryant was the first judge to issue such an order.

== The appeal ==
On September 26, 2001, Horan's lawyer, Jack L. Gould, appealed the decision to the United States Court of Appeals for the Fourth Circuit. He contended that § 1983 was not an appropriate vehicle for Harvey's action. He stated that the procedural flaws in the claim required that it be dismissed because it was really a successive petition for a writ of habeas corpus and an attempt to get around strict rules and deadlines.

On January 23, 2002, the court concluded that Harvey's rights had not been violated and that the lower court had erred in its decision. Fourth Circuit Chief Judge J. Harvie Wilkinson III wrote the opinion, in which Judge Niemeyer joined. Judge King wrote a concurring opinion.

The majority opinion stated that the claim was, in effect, a petition for a writ of habeas corpus brought without leave of court. According to a previous case, Heck v. Humphrey (1994), a convicted criminal defendant cannot bring a § 1983 action that would "necessarily imply the invalidity of his conviction or sentence" unless the defendant can prove that his "conviction or sentence has already been invalidated." In this decision, the Supreme Court found that civil tort actions are "not appropriate vehicles for challenging the validity of outstanding criminal judgments." As such, the majority opinion in the appeal overturned the lower court's ruling because it found that Harvey had substantively failed to make a claim under § 1983. Judge Wilkinson wrote that Harvey had attempted to circumvent habeas corpus requirements, which required exhaustion of remedies at the state level before moving to the federal level. By bringing his claim directly to federal court under § 1983, Harvey had violated procedure:

While we agree with Harvey that the question of guilt or innocence lies at the heart of the criminal justice system, we also believe that the proper process for raising violations of constitutional rights in criminal proceedings cannot be abandoned. Because the substance of a claim cannot be severed from the proper manner of presenting it, we find Harvey's § 1983 action to be deficient.

The opinion went on to state that Harvey's action under § 1983 "sought to invalidate a final state conviction whose lawfulness has in no way been impugned". Harvey claimed that he was challenging neither the fact nor the duration of his confinement, pointing out that he merely seeks evidence which could also prove his guilt. The court found this argument to be an evasion, saying, "He is trying to use a § 1983 action as a discovery device to overturn his state conviction". The majority opinion asserted that the finality of convictions could not be challenged by advances in technology:

The possibility of post-conviction developments, whether in law or science, is simply too great to justify judicially sanctioned constitutional attacks upon final criminal judgments. …Establishing a constitutional due process right under § 1983 to retest evidence with each forward step in forensic science would leave perfectly valid judgments in a perpetually unsettled state.

According to the majority opinion, the only purpose of Harvey's claim was to challenge his conviction based on evidence that was available to him at the time of his trial. As such, the court concluded that Harvey's rights had not been violated by Horan. The court also stated that Harvey could only make his claim in habeas corpus, but that even if he had the court would be forced to dismiss it, for he had already filed such a petition in federal court.

Circuit Judge King concurred in part and in judgment with the majority decision. While he agreed that the lower court's decision was incorrect, he also contended that Harvey's claim could properly be brought under § 1983. The judge stated that the act of providing Harvey access to evidence did not alone necessarily imply the invalidity of Harvey's conviction. King agrees with Harvey's attorney, Peter J. Neufeld, that the evidence could indeed inculpate Harvey and thus that § 1983 was a proper vehicle for bringing the action. However, King determined that since the material had been available to him at trial and since he had not been denied access to the legal system or evidence known to be exculpatory, Harvey did not have a legal claim to discover evidence under Brady v. Maryland. He stated that Harvey's claim was invalid not because he violated procedure, but because he could not prove that a state actor deprived him of a federally protected right.

== Fallout ==
After the January 2002 decision was handed down, Harvey applied to Virginia's Fairfax Circuit Court for DNA testing based on a 2001 law allowing felons increased access to potentially exculpatory biological evidence that had not previously been subjected to the current DNA testing method. On March 1, 2002, the court ordered the Division of Forensic Science to conduct the testing. On May 15, 2002, after the testing was completed, the division filed a certificate of analysis stating that Harvey could not be eliminated as a possible contributor to the sperm fractions found on the victim. On September 24, 2002, Harvey filed a petition for a writ of habeas corpus in the Virginia Supreme Court, challenging the validity of the certificate of analysis and related test results. The court dismissed the petition on June 10, 2004, saying that it did not have jurisdiction to consider it.

Back in March 2002, the federal appeal had come before the full Fourth Circuit as an en banc reconsideration (as opposed to the original three-judge panel). By this time, the issue was moot, but two judges, J. Michael Luttig and Wilkinson, wrote anyway. Luttig wrote that the "right of access to evidence for tests which ... could prove beyond any doubt that the individual in fact did not commit the crime, is constitutionally required ... as a matter of basic fairness." Luttig also concluded that there is "a limited, constitutional, post-conviction right of access to previously produced forensic evidence for the purpose of [DNA] testing." Wilkinson responded by expressing hope that inmates like Harvey would have access to DNA testing but that it was a matter for the legislature to decide. Significantly, his majority opinion in the original appeal stated, "our decision reflects the core democratic ideal that if this entitlement is to be conferred, it should be accomplished by legislative action rather than by a federal court as a matter of constitutional right."

Wilkinson's hopes were manifested with the passage of the bipartisan Innocence Protection Act in 2004. On February 10, 2000, Senator Patrick Leahy (D-VT) introduced the act after devoting nearly a year to evaluating flaws in the administration of the death penalty nationwide. A few months later, the bill was introduced in the House by Bill Delahunt (D-MA) and Ray LaHood (R-IL). Innocence Project co-founders Neufeld and Barry C. Scheck testified several times over the next few years as witnesses before hearings of committee on the Act. Both mentioned the Harvey v. Horan case in their testimony, saying that it was significant for being the first federal court decision in the country to recognize a constitutional right of access to post-conviction DNA testing. The Innocence Protection Act eventually passed in the House of Representatives by an overwhelming majority (393–14) on November 5, 2003. On October 9, 2004, the legislation, which was sponsored by Senator Patrick Leahy, passed unanimously in the United States Senate after narrowly moving through the Senate Judiciary Committee.

In 2009, the United States Supreme Court addressed the issue of a due process right to DNA testing in District Attorney's Office v. Osborne. The court decided that prisoners did not have a right to the testing. The decision only affects those few states that do not have laws similar to the federal Innocence Protection Act that explicitly give prisoners a right to DNA evidence.

== Resources ==
- U.S. Judge Says Felons Entitled to DNA Tests - The Washington Post
- VA Judge: Inmates have right to DNA tests - The Associated Press
- Appeal from the United States District Court
- Virginia Supreme Court decision
- Post-conviction ethics
- Conservative US Circuit Court Judges Back Post-Conviction DNA Testing
- The Innocence Protection Act in the 108th Congress
