= Marijuana Business Daily =

Trade news website

- Website type: Trade news website
- Available in: English
- Headquarters: Lakewood, Colorado
- Owner: Marijuana Business Media
- Editor: Chris Walsh
- Website: mjbizdaily.com
- Commercial: Yes
- Launched: 2011; 15 years ago

Marijuana Business Daily (formerly known as MMJ Business Daily, also known as MJBizDaily) is a Colorado-based business news outlet for professionals in the recreational and medical cannabis industry in the United States. The publication was founded in 2011 by Marijuana Business Media, a division of Anne Holland Ventures, Inc. The CEO is Chris Walsh. It is a privately held, woman-owned business.

The daily news site, www.mjbizdaily.com, is paired with a 10-times-a-year print and digital magazine that covers cannabis trends and how-to advice for business owners, Marijuana Business Magazine.

The business also covers international marijuana business, including Canada, Europe and Latin America with MJBizDaily International.

In addition, MJBizDaily has a site dedicated to news in the hemp and CBD space: Hemp Industry Daily.

In November 2012, the publication launched The Marijuana Business Conference & Expo (MJBizCon), a national trade show for the legal marijuana industry. The Marijuana Business Conference & Expo is held annually in Las Vegas and is widely recognized as the largest professional trade show for legal Cannabis markets and ancillary products in the world.

That show is complemented by MJBizConNEXT each spring.

In March 2013, the publication also released the first edition of its Marijuana Business Factbook, with data on cannabis industry growth and opportunities in investing, cultivation, retail and manufacturing. The most recent edition of the Factbook was published in May 2020 and predicts annual U.S. domestic Cannabis sales at $30 to $37 billion by 2024.

== See also ==
- Medical cannabis in the United States
- List of largest cannabis companies by revenue
- Cannabis industry
- Cannabis dispensaries in the United States
- National Cannabis Industry Association
