= European Industrial Hemp Association =

European Industrial Hemp Association (EIHA)
- Founded: 2000
- Purpose: Hemp policies in the European Union
- Location(s): Brussels, Belgium; Germany
- Region served: European Union
- President: Daniel Kruse
- Main organ: Board (2021–2023: Christophe Février, Rachele Invernizzi, Jacek Kramarz, Daniel Kruse, Florian Pichlmaier, Tony Reeves, Mark Reinders)
- Website: www.eiha.org

The European Industrial Hemp Association (EIHA) is a consortium of the hemp-processing industry representing the common interests of industrial hemp farmers and producers, both nationally and at the European level. EIHA is the only consortium in the industrial hemp sector in Europe. This sector includes, inter alia, the use of hemp fibers, shavings, seeds and cannabinoids. Although focused on hemp industries of the European Union, EIHA also has members based in non-EU countries.

== History ==
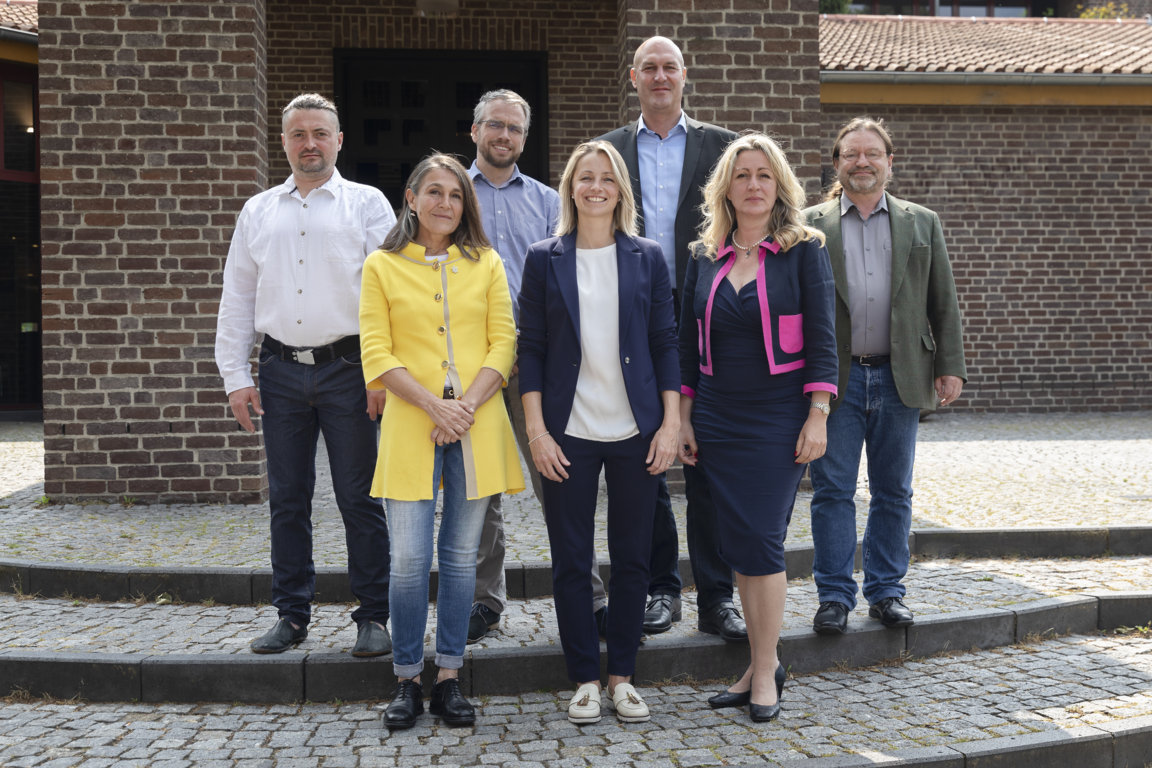
Board of the European Industrial Hemp Association in 2019

EIHA was founded on 14 September 2000 in Wolfsburg, Germany by seven hemp fibre-processing companies. On 23 November 2005 the entity was officially registered in Brühl as an association under registry number VR1397.

EIHA started in 2003 organizing the International Conference of the European Industrial Hemp Association, one of the largest of its kind with over 400 attendees from 49 countries. The number of attendees in the past years has increased consistently with the growth of the sector.

Since 2011 EIHA has been a member of the technical committee on bio-based products of the European Committee for Standardization. EIHA also joined the Expert group in 2013. That same year, EIHA joined the European Commission "Bioeconomy Panel" and the working group “Sustainable Bioresources for a Growing Bioeconomy” of the EU Standing Committee on Agricultural Research. More recently, EIHA has joined the D37 Committee on Cannabis of ASTM International and provided contributions to the World Health Organization in its review of Cannabis and Cannabis-related substances.

== Activities ==
EIHA members come from EU and non-EU countries, and comprise players in industrial hemp processing and distribution, the car manufacturing, construction, food and feedstock industries, as well as the pharmaceutical sector. Research institutes and financial investors are also amongst those represented. Organisations, research institutions, companies and individuals in the industrial hemp sector and the other natural fiber sectors are associate members; hemp producers are full members. The EIHA often publishes information about the European natural fiber industry.

== Publications ==
See also: Karus, M., and Desanlis, F. (2002). The Industrial Hemp Association (EIHA). Journal of Industrial Hemp 7 (1), 2002.
