= Cheryl Shuman =

American businessperson and media personality

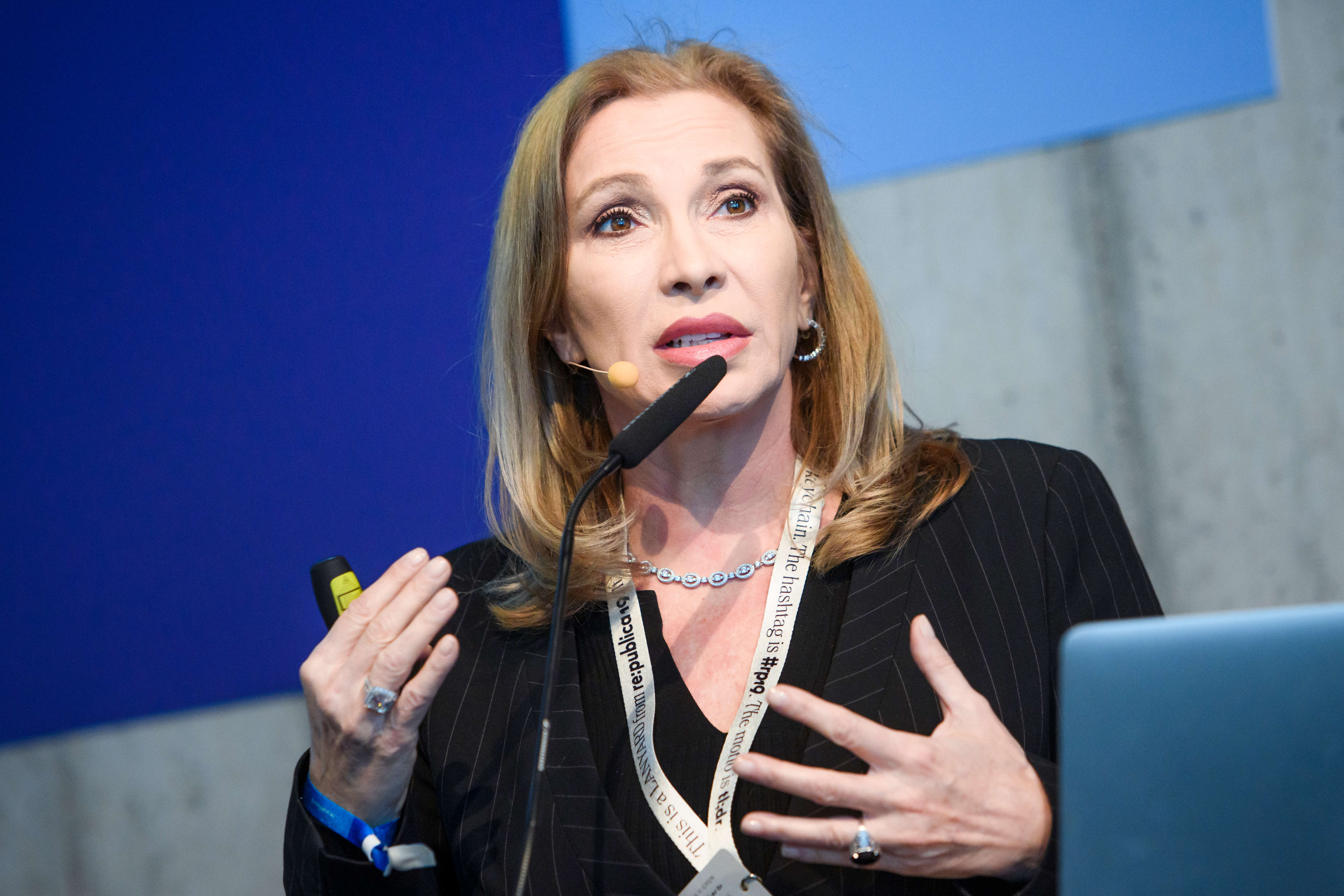
- Shuman in 2019
- Born: Cheryl Lynn Killen; March 19, 1960 (age 66); Portsmouth, Ohio, U.S.
- Occupation: Media personality
- Children: 2

Cheryl Shuman (born 19 March 1960) is an American businesswoman, media personality and promoter. Shuman's personal business ventures have included couponing advice, eyeglasses supplier for actors and a private marijuana club in Los Angeles called Beverly Hills Cannabis Club. She promoted herself variously as the "Coupon Queen," "Optician to the Stars," and the "Martha Stewart of Marijuana."

== Early life ==
Shuman was born and raised in Portsmouth, Ohio.

== Career ==
In 1980, Shuman identified herself as a "Coupon Queen," providing advice to Ohioans about saving money using coupons. She self-published a Complete Guide to Successful Couponing and Refunding (under her married name, Cheryl Peart), sold a monthly newsletter of coupon tips, and gave talks to local groups about couponing. This led to regular appearances giving couponing tips on the PM Magazine television show. According to Shuman, while recovering from a bad car accident in 1983, her TV appearances ended as well as her couponing business.

Shuman got a job working as an assistant to an optician in London, Ohio. She later moved to California and worked at an eyeglass store in Encino. Shuman began traveling directly to the homes of wealthy clients around Los Angeles to sell them eyeglasses from her Personal Eyes Optique collection. Through these contacts, she created the business Starry Eyes Optical Services that supplied eyeglasses to movies and television. According to Shuman, her eyeglass business went bankrupt in 1995 following her failed litigation against actor Steven Seagal and others. Into the 2000s, Shuman operated a website called Starry Eyes for selling a line of eyeglass frames that replicated those used in popular films. Shuman described herself as “Optician to the Stars” as well as a “Former International Fashion Model.”

Shuman became active in promoting the retail marijuana business in California. In a 2016 interview, Shuman said she became a regular pot user after a doctor recommended it as a mood stabilizer to help her eliminate large daily amounts of Prozac and Xanax that she was taking. Shuman said she founded a Beverly Hills Cannabis Club in 1996, the year medical marijuana was legalized in California. In a 2015 New York Times article titled "Cannabis Queen of Beverly Hills", Shuman said that she used large amounts of marijuana oil in 2006 to cure herself of ovarian cancer as well as used cannabis to treat her hypertension and a benign mass on her liver.

Shuman called herself "the Martha Stewart of Marijuana" and hosted some private events to promote a wide variety of her own possible marijuana-related businesses for upscale clients. Shuman attended activist meetings but was removed from National Organization for the Reform of Marijuana Laws (NORML) Women’s Alliance steering committee for using the organization to promote her own products. Allen St. Pierre, the executive director of NORML in 2015 said, “Cheryl Shuman is always selling herself.”

== Litigations ==
In 1987, Shuman accused her next door neighbor of battery during a confrontation about the condition of the neighbor’s home. At the trial, some witnesses said Shuman appeared to be the instigator and a jury found Shuman's neighbor innocent of all charges.

In 1995, Shuman filed a sexual harassment lawsuit against Steven Seagal with whom she claimed a four-month affair. The suit also named actor Michael Caine, Seagal's wife Kelly LeBrock, Warner Bros. and other assorted defendants for conspiracy, breach of contract, negligence, assault and battery. Calling the lawsuit “unintelligible,” the judge dismissed it with prejudice. Shuman had been arrested for felony perjury the previous month for using the District Attorney's stationery to forge documents and a press release.

== Personal life ==
Shuman married David Peart and lived in London, Ohio. They had one child before divorcing in 1983. After moving to California, Shuman married television newscaster Phil Shuman with whom she had a second child.

== See also ==
- Cannabis in California
