= Rylie Maedler =

American advocate and businesswoman (born 2005)

- Born: December 7, 2005 (age 20); Rehoboth Beach, Delaware, US
- Occupation: Businesswoman
- Known for: Cannabis advocacy

Rylie Maedler (born December 7, 2005) is a medical cannabis advocate and businesswoman.

== Cannabis advocacy ==
Maedler was born December 7, 2005, in Rehoboth Beach, Delaware, to Janie and Sean Maedler. At age 7, in October 2013, after her parents noticed swelling and lopsidedness in her face, she was diagnosed with aggressive central giant-cell granuloma, a condition which causes tumors, pain, and disfigurement requiring surgery and chemotherapy to manage. After researching alternative solutions, in December 2013, Janie Maedler began treating her daughter using cannabis oil, which at the time was illegal for minors and illegal without prescription in Delaware, acquiring CBD and THC-A oil from dispensaries in other states. Rylie Maedler's tumors began shrinking and her condition stabilized. As of 2022, Rylie Maedler continues to take CBD and THC-A in oil form daily.

Maedler faced stigma in her elementary school for her use of the cannabis derived oils for her treatment. Rylie's Smile Foundation was founded in February 2015 as a 501(c) organization focused on providing health education and advocating for more treatment options for sick children. Maedler and her mother contacted Republican state senator for Delaware Ernesto Lopez to help make medical cannabis legal for children in the state.

Introduced by Lopez and co-sponsored by Pete Schwartzkopf, Senate Bill 90, also known was "Rylie's Law", was passed by the Delaware Senate unanimously on June 2, 2015. The bill permitted the use of cannabis based oils to treat epilepsy and dystonia in children. "Rylie's Law" was approved in the House on June 11 and signed into law by the Governor on June 23. On June 9, 2016, Senate Bill 181 was passed unanimously by the Delaware Senate unanimously, allowing students to use prescribed cannabis oil in schools, also advocated for by Maedler, who had to walk off school grounds to take her own medicine. It passed the House on June 16 and was signed into law by the Governor on September 7.

In December 2017, Rylie's Smile Foundation succeeded in petitioning for autism to be added to the list of qualifying conditions for access to medical cannabis in Delaware.

In 2020, she appeared in the documentary CBD Nation, a film exploring the medical value of cannabis.

== Rylie's Sunshine ==
In July 2017, Maedler founded Rylie's Sunshine, a for-profit company to produce cannabis oil. The company bought a farm in Birdsnest, Virginia. 4,884 cannabis plants were donated by Front Range Biosciences, a Colorado-based agricultural biotech company, for Rylie's Sunshine's first hemp harvest in 2020.
