= Madeline Martinez =

American cannabis rights activist

- Occupation: Cannaibis rights activist

Madeline Martinez is an American cannabis rights activist.

== Career ==
Martinez worked as correctional officer in California, before retiring and focusing on cannabis activism.

Martinez is a longtime advocate for the legalization of cannabis. She started her efforts by collecting signatures for Oregon Ballot Measure 67 (1998), which modified state law to allow the cultivation, possession, and use of marijuana by doctor recommendation for patients with certain medical conditions. She later worked on the successful Oregon Ballot Measure 91 (2014) campaign, which legalized the recreational use of marijuana.

In 2009, she established the World Famous Cannabis Cafe, which operated until March 2016. In 2015, she was reportedly working to end cannabis prohibition at the national level, "to protect the rights of women and families stuck in the gray areas created by legislative changes across the country".

Martinez is the executive director of Oregon NORML, the largest affiliate of the National Organization for the Reform of Marijuana Laws. She serves on NORML's board of directors, co-founded the NORML Women's Alliance, and was named the organization's "Pauline Sabin Winner" in 2007. She is also a member of Law Enforcement Against Prohibition.

== Personal life ==
Martinez is a mother and grandmother, and resides in Portland, Oregon.
