= Cannabis product testing =

Testing of the properties of cannabis destined for consumer use

Cannabis product testing is a form of product testing that analyzes the quality of cannabis extracts, edibles, and cannabinoid content in an emergent consumer market eager to sell adult use products. Analytical chemistry and microbiology laboratories are important entities in consumer protection. These labs not only determine the condition and viability of cannabinoids, water content, heavy metals, pesticides, terpenes, yeast, but also the presence of mold, mycotoxins, and solvents. These laboratories emerged when advocates of cannabis testing raised concerns about potential contaminants.

The popularity of cannabis and cannabinoid products grew following the legalization of cannabinoid products in the United States starting in 2012.

Testing regulations and the Legality of cannabis by U.S. jurisdiction varies significantly. Since 2012, 24 states have legalized recreational cannabis consumption and, except for the District of Columbia, acted to implement legislation that also legalizes commercial production. By 2025, 40 states had legalized medical cannabis.

Nowadays, the majority of the U.S. population can purchase cannabis and cannabinoid products as easily as alcohol. But exposure to contaminants is often overlooked. Limited regulation threatens product safety in the "gold rush" era of a fast-growing cannabis industry. Analytical chemistry and microbiology testing that protects consumer safety and prevents unfair practices becomes an added cost that most startups avoid due to the lack of oversight of recreational and medicinal cannabis in the United States. Advanced analytical testing is critical given trade-offs between safety and quality in cannabinoid therapeutics and nutraceuticals. Product or compliance testing determines the chemical makeup and overall quality of the formulation before the sale of products. Testing is required before sale in almost every state that cannabis use is legal. Maine is the closest exception as they do not require pre-sale testing on medicinal use cannabis.

The Analytes
| Analytes | Examples | Effects of Analytes | How analysis is done |
|---|---|---|---|
| Cannabinoids | THC, CBD | Targets various receptors in endocannabinoid system. Responsible for psychoactive and therapeutic effects of cannabis. | LC-MS, HPLC, FT-IR |
| Terpenes | Limonene, Myrcene | Very volatile compounds responsible for the smell and taste of a plant. Also contributes to the therapeutic effects of cannabis. | GC-FID, GC-MS |
| Pesticides | Paclobutrazol, Myclobutanil | A wide category of chemicals that control pest, and Microbial populations on and around the plant. Some are even used to Regulate plant growth. However, they are also toxic to people. | UPLC-MS, GC-MS |
| Heavy/Toxic Metals | Lead, Arsenic, Mercury, Copper, Cadmium, Chromium, Nickel, Antimony | Toxic metals are known to interfere with cellular functions. Over time the accumulation of heavy metals can cause damage to a variety of organs and systems in your body. | ICP-MS ICP-OES |
| Solvents | Butane, Propane, Methanol | Solvent are primarily used in extractions to make concentrates. If not removed properly it can be hazardous for consumption. | GC-FID + Headspace Sampler |
| Microbes | Aspergillus, Salmonella, Mold | Can Infect the body or produce harmful toxins. | qPCR, Microbial Cultures |
| Water Content | Water Content, Water Activity | Water content alludes to quality of the plant while water activity indicates the amount of water available to microorganisms. These are important for maintaining quality of product and reducing chance of microbial growth. | Moisture Meter, Hygrometer |

== History ==
=== New York ===
New York established the Office of Cannabis Management at the same time they legalized adult-use cannabis in 2021. They are responsible for standards that keep consumers safe from contaminants as well as keeping the state safe from federal action. The testing requirements started off simple with cannabinoids, pesticides, and mold, before phasing in more analytes throughout 2022 and 2023.

=== California ===
California started mandatory testing for cannabis products in 2018 with its “Medicinal and Adult-Use Cannabis Regulation and Safety Act.” Licenses and regulations are handled by the Department of Cannabis Control.

=== Colorado ===
In 2015, the first government standards for testing were proposed in Colorado's legislature, when potency and microbial testing became mandatory in the state. Colorado cannabis testing laboratories, such as AgriScience Labs, are regulated by the Colorado Department of Revenue's Marijuana Enforcement Division and the Colorado Department of Public Health and Environment. Over the next several years, other tests became mandatory, such as residual solvent analysis and pesticides.

=== Other states ===
Cannabis testing is also required in other states, such as California, Oregon, Massachusetts, and Nevada. Washington State added routine pesticide testing and random or investigation-driven heavy metal testing, formerly required only for medical cannabis, to its testing suite for all cannabis on March 2, 2022.

== Standards ==
Cannabis testing for medical cannabis placed in Schedule III is regulated by the Drug Enforcement Administration Diversion Control Division with Medical Marijuana Analytical Lab registration beginning in 2026. Other standards and regulations are dependent on each state.

=== New York (Standards Subsection) ===
In the State of New York, cannabis testing standards are managed by the Office of Cannabis management. Labs are responsible to test cannabis for total cannabinoids/cannabinoid profile, pesticides, metals, moisture content, filth/foreign material, water activity, residual solvents, terpenes, mycotoxins, specific bacteria, total aerobic bacteria count, total yeast and mold. The OCM dictates that each lab needs to be ISO 17025 accredited, the methods need to be approved by the OCM, and proper METRC seed-to-sale documentation is required. Furthermore, the OCM does routine inspections to ensure laboratories are maintaining set standards. As of 2026, there are only 9 laboratories in the state permitted to test for the full scope of required analytes.

== See also ==
- Certificate of analysis
