= Rowshan Reordan =

Founder of first woman owned analytical chemical testing cannabis lab

Rowshan Reordan is the founder and CEO of Green Leaf Lab LLC. Founded in 2011, as the first accredited, woman-owned cannabis and hemp CBD analytical testing laboratory in the United States certified by the Women Business Enterprise National Council (WBENC) and AOAC International.

Reordan runs certified testing labs in the states of Oregon and California.

== Early life and education ==
She later earned a Juris Doctor from the University of New Mexico School of Law in 2006. She also holds a Master's degree in political science with a focus on human rights from the same school.

== Career ==
Reordan began to be interested medical and recreational cannabis testing was after seeing the struggles of a close friend living with HIV, who often used medical cannabis. Their death led her to wonder if medical cannabis products were safe and uncontaminated. At that time, the industry lacked state or federal regulations to ensure the safety of cannabis as a consumed product. Reordan saw Colorado and Washington legalize recreational cannabis without product safety testing standards, leading her to open Green Leaf Lab in Oregon in 2011 as the first woman-owned analytical cannabis testing laboratory. The lab focused on pesticides and mold in cannabis to ensure the product would be safe for consumers.

=== Green Leaf Lab ===
Green Leaf Lab trademarked their "Cannalysis" process of analytic cannabis testing and employed trained chemists using standardized and peer reviewed analytic testing equipment to set new industry standards.

In 2019, Green Leaf Lab filed a complaint ending in a legal battle that centered around the critical need to protect proprietary lab procedures and transparency in the emergent cannabis industry's regulatory standards, for which Reordan has been a leader. Her work in analytical chemical testing of cannabis potency and accusations of impropriety were dismissed in U.S. California Central District Court.

In 2013, Reordan was invited to join a subcommittee on testing medical marijuana for Oregon's House Bill 3460 to provide recommendations from the industry. In 2015, Reordan gave a statement before the Oregon Legislature outlining eight product safety and public health recommendations to better regulate the cannabis industry:

1. Laboratories should have regulatory oversight. This will ensure a system where there is accountability and standardization for the safety testing of cannabis.
2. Independent Third-Party Testing should be required. ... It is in the best interest of Oregon patients and consumers to have an Oregon-based regulatory agency that follows national quality standards that are known to be more stringent than international standards.
3. Laboratories should be required to perform random sampling and initiate a chain of custody system for batch testing certification.
4. More stringent microbiological (mold) testing should be required. The current law requires general screening for molds. This screening process does not require identification of harmful molds (for instance, Aspergillus, of which certain species can produce toxins). The current system allows harmful molds to “pass” if the overall screen falls below 10,000 colony forming units per gram. We believe that requiring a more specific microbiological screen for harmful molds will promote public health and safety.
5. More specific pesticide testing should be required.
6. Residual solvent testing should be required.
7. Standardized methods for potency testing should be required. ... [to] support a system that patients and consumers can trust.
8. Laboratory and testing standards should protect public health, while taking into consideration affordable testing and the legitimization of the cannabis industry. Because cannabis testing is in its infancy, there are many theories regarding the best way to analyze cannabis for safe use.
