= Oregon Indoor Clean Air Act =

Law restricting tobacco smoking in Oregon

The Oregon Indoor Clean Air Act, also known as the Smokefree Workplace Law, is a measure passed in 1981 by the US State of Oregon prohibiting smoking in public indoor places except in certain designated smoking areas. The objective is to protect non-smokers in confined areas from second-hand smoke. Beginning on January 1, 2016, the law was extended to cover "inhalant delivery systems" such as e-cigarettes.

== Provisions and exceptions ==
The Indoor Clean Air Act was passed by the Oregon state legislature in 1981. In order to protect non-smokers from second-hand smoke, the law prohibited smoking, except in designated smoking areas, in public "confined" areas, which it defined as retail stores, banks, grocery stores, meeting rooms, and commercial establishments, but excluding such areas as cocktail lounges, offices occupied only by a smoker, a public meeting hall being used in a private capacity, a tobacco retail store, and a restaurant seating fewer than 30 people. As of 2017, the law also forbids smoking outside within 10 feet (3.0 m) of windows, air vents, entrances and exits, and ramps leading to or from them. Effective January 1, 2016, the law was also extended to include "inhalant delivery systems" that use a vapor or aerosol, such as e-cigarettes.

== Rules and regulations ==
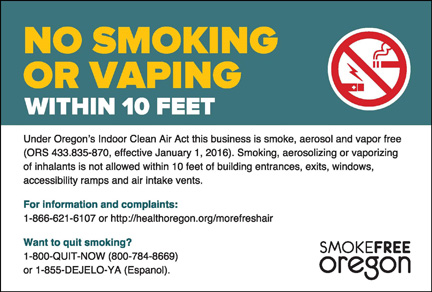

The Oregon Health Authority has varied rules and regulations pertaining to both citizens and businesses regarding the Oregon Indoor Clean Air act. Initially, when these regulations are thought to have been violated, a claim or complaint has to be made to the Local Public Health Administrators (LPHA), the administrative force for the Oregon Indoor Clean Air act. It is then determined if the site has to be smoke and vapor free in accordance with ORS 433.835 through 433.850. Signs will be posted on site, except where defined in OAR 333-015-0035, for a smoke free area. These signs will either state that ten feet around the site is a prohibited smoke and vapor free area(s), or that the entirety of the area(s) is a smoke and vapor free zone. Violations of the act include smoking, and or the use of aerosolizing or vaporizing equipment within ten feet of: Entrances, Exits, Windows that open, Ventilation intakes, and Accessibility ramps. If notified of a violation by any party, the site or business will receive a warning from the LPHA, alerting them to fix the behavior present. If another offense is reported to the LPHA by form of complaint within 5 days of the first response from the LPHA, they will take further action and make an unannounced visit of the site to determine if the act is being violated. If found to be in violation upon the inspection, penalties will be incurred. These penalties include fines that begin at an amount of $300 per day of each violation for the first violation, second of $400 per day, and the third and any subsequent violations $500 per day.

== Later developments ==
In 1997 Oregon launched a statewide Tobacco Prevention and Education Program (TPEP) with the goal of reducing tobacco-related illnesses and deaths. TPEP was created immediately after the passage of Measure 44, under which tobacco excise taxes were raised by thirty cents and 10% dedicated to funding TPEP. TPEP partners with the Centers for Disease Control and Prevention's Best Practices for Comprehensive Tobacco Control Programs. They also collaborate with public and private entities and community organizations.

In November 1998, The Oregon Department of Environmental Equality asked a participatory group to develop a program to reduce the impact of air toxins in Oregon. Oregon's Department of Environmental Equality was partnered with this program until the new air toxins rule in Oregon was passed. The new rule requires that in specific geographic areas of high risk, a risk reduction plan must be developed. For example, air polluters can be required to assess the impact of their activities and implement technological solutions to mitigate it.

In 2000, Oregon Restaurant Association v. City of Corvallis affirmed that cities had the right to enact their own, more strict ordinances on smoking and led the way towards removing preemption with the Oregon Indoor Clean Air Act. However, until this law passed in 2009, preemption allowed all cities to enact their own regulations for tobacco smoking to include establishments not explicitly defined in ORS 433.835. In 2007, the Oregon Clean Air Act (O.R.S. §§ 433.835 et seq. (2007)) passed to remove preemption and include bars, restaurants, and all workplaces as smoke-free.

== Effects ==
An enclosed area either owned by a public or private employer must regulate this rule for their employees during their course of employment. Workplaces that must be smoke free include: bars, employee break rooms, restaurants, hotels, motels, retail and wholesale establishments, this list is not limited to other facilities. Smoke-free laws help protect restaurants and bar employees and patrons from the harm of secondhand smoke. There is no safe level of exposure to secondhand smoke. OICAA helps seven out of every ten smokers who want to quit smoking by providing those individuals with public environment free from any pressure or temptation to smoke. The National Cancer Institute in December 2016 conducted a review of economic literature on tobacco control; evidence shows that smoke-free policies like OICAA does not cause adverse economic outcomes for businesses included restaurants and bars. In 2009 reported by International Agency for Research on Cancer concluded that there is sufficient evidence that implements smoke free legislation decreasing respiratory symptoms in workers. NSBI also commented on this matter presenting that after reviewing economic variables that bars located in areas that have been already smoke free, sold for similar prices for bars with no restrictions. In 2010 an analysis conducted on economics based on smoke-free laws stated "There is clear evidence that smoke free legislation does not hurt restaurant, and in some cases business may improve."
