= Giadha DeCarcer =

Italian-born American entrepreneur

Giadha Aguirre DeCarcer (born c. 1975) is an Italian-born American entrepreneur. She is the CEO and cofounder of CTrust, which provides financing advice and data analysis to participants in the cannabis market. From 2014 to 2021 she was the founder and CEO, then Executive Chair, of New Frontier Data, a big data and analytics reporting provider in the cannabis industry.

After immigrating to the U.S. as a high school junior, DeCarcer began to sell real estate as a teenager in Florida. She earned a B.A. degree from University of Pennsylvania in 1999 and began to work University of Pennsylvania in 1999 and then as a consultant to the U.S. government in intelligence in 2004, while completing her M.A at Georgetown University. DeCarcer next founded a series of companies focusing on data analysis, including GNI International and VentureCamp LLC. In 2014, she began providing services to the cannabis industry, founding New Frontier Data. She co-founded CTrust in 2022.

== Early life ==
DeCarcer was born in Rome, Italy. The daughter of a Spanish diplomat and a Cuban actress, she was raised in Switzerland, France and Spain. She immigrated to the U.S. at the age of 16 as a high school junior, after graduating from the Lycée Français de Madrid.

After less than two years, she began selling investment real estate, earning her Florida real estate license in 1993, followed by her mortgage broker's license a year later. While working in real estate, DeCarcer earned an associate degree in Business Administration at Miami Dade Community College. She received a Bachelor of Arts degree from the University of Pennsylvania in 1999 in International Relations & Trade and a Master of Arts degree in International Security from Georgetown University in 2005.

== Career ==
DeCarcer worked as an analyst in investment banking with JPMorgan Chase from 1999 to 2003 and later as a consultant in intelligence with the U.S. government in 2004 and 2005. Over the next several years she started several data-driven companies including GNI International and VentureCamp LLC, and held the original patent applications for the technology that became the basis for Progressive's Snapshot, Verizon's Hum and other GPS-based driver monitoring systems.

She founded New Frontier Data in 2014, serving as its CEO for six years before becoming its Executive Chair through the end of 2021. New Frontier is a multinational big data and digital analytics firm, providing business intelligence and risk management reporting to cannabis industry participants worldwide. Under DeCarcer, the company began to publish reports assessing opportunities, price forecasts and upcoming legislation in the cannabis industry that were used by lawmakers, cannabis entrepreneurs and investors.

In 2018, DeCarcer created the InterCannAlliance to help new companies in the cannabis industry learn and agree on best practices for the emerging cannabis market. She also created the Women Entrepreneurship Reinforcement (WeR), a program to mentor and coach women starting their own businesses. As an expert in the cannabis industry, DeCarcer has been cited by numerous media outlets, including The Washington Post, CNN Business, Fortune Politico, USA Today, The Washington Times, Inc., TheStreet and Forbes. She was featured in the book and documentary Breaking the Glass Ceiling: Women, Weed, and Business and the documentary Mary Janes: The Women of Weed.

In 2022, she co-founded, and serves as CEO of, CTrust, LLC, which provides financing and restructuring advice and data analysis to entrepreneurs and lenders in the cannabis industry. One initiative of the company has been to develop the equivalent of a credit score for cannabis companies, to give lenders and investors a yardstick for judging the creditworthiness of industry participants.

== Recognition ==
DeCarcer is a member of the Forbes Technology Council. She was a 2019 recipient of a Washington Business Journal "Women Who Mean Business Award". In 2017 she won a bronze Stevie Award, and in 2018 she won a silver Stevie Award. In 2017, she was listed as one of the "Women to Watch" in Washington D.C. by Washingtonian.
