= Certificate of analysis =

Formal laboratory-prepared document

A certificate of analysis (COA) is a formal laboratory-prepared document that details the results of (and sometimes the specifications and analytical methods for) one or more laboratory analyses, signed—manually or electronically—by an authorized representative of the entity conducting the analyses. This document gives assurances to the recipient that the analyzed item is what it is designated to be, or has the features advertised by the producer. The design and content of a COA may be based upon a set of requirements identified by the lab, by regulatory-driven requirements, and/or by standards developed by standard developing organizations. The COA is used in a wide variety of industries, including but not limited to the agriculture, chemical, clinical research, food and beverage, and pharmaceutical industries.

== Use in various industries ==
The COA is typically used in industries where the quality of a produced good is of significant importance and the COA recipient needs assurances of that quality. By extension, this often means regulations, standards, and/or guidelines are in place to better ensure analyses are approved and reported correctly. For example, regulations, standards, and/or guidelines affect COA use in agriculture, chemical, clinical research, food and beverage, and pharmaceutical industries. The COA may be used as a certification of product quality, an identification document, or a comparison document, depending upon the context.

=== Cannabis industry ===
A certificate of analysis can be associated with cannabis and cannabis-derived products, attesting to their laboratory analysis for cannabinoids, adulterants, heavy metals, pesticides, mold, etc. This gives consumers "an easy way to review test results from responsible companies selling cannabis and cannabis-infused products".

In the United States, as of September 2022, the regulatory mandate for requiring a COA is driven by state law, which can vary significantly. States like California and Maine lay out clear regulations concerning how cannabis and cannabis products are reported on a COA. Other states may not regulate COAs. Additionally, products containing cannabidiol (CBD), a non-psychoactive constituent of cannabis that is capable of being extracted from hemp, are not mandated to have a corresponding COA by the U.S. government, though some states like Indiana require a COA for CBD, along with a scannable QR code.

== Contents and delivery of a COA ==
As regulations across counties, states, territories, countries, and supranational unions can vary, the contents and delivery/inclusion mechanisms for COAs will vary. Broadly speaking, however, the following represent elements that may be common to a COA:

- the demographics and other identifiers for the supplier of the product/material/sample
- the demographics and license information for the laboratory conducting the analyses
- the demographics or details of any ancillary entities associated with the tested product (e.g., distributor or cultivator, as with cannabis products)
- a clear description of the identity of the product/material/sample
- a clear identifier of what type of testing was performed (e.g., "regulatory compliance testing")
- any associated batch numbers, sample numbers, etc.
- a chain of custody of the product/sample being tested, including dates, times, and relevant photos
- the weight or unit count of the product/material/sample
- the quality and concentration of the product/material/sample
- the analytical methods (standard and non-standard), analytical instrumentation, and specifications (e.g., limits of detection and quantitation)
- the analytical results, dated and presented in "a uniform, accurate, and concise manner", with a clear indication of passing or failing, when applicable
- a key for abbreviations/initialisms and what they mean
- the signature of the authorized person who performed or approved the analysis, as well as contact information and qualifications
- the initials or signature of the authorized person who corrected the COA (if permitted), plus a clear identifier indicating the COA is corrected

In the case of a produced chemical, drug, ingredient, or standard, the manufacturer will likely include a COA for the end user. In the case of a tested product/material/sample, the recipient of the COA will be the entity that ordered the analysis or mandated the test via regulation, as with cannabis testing. If a regulatory body mandated the test, they will designate how the results should be delivered, whether physically or electronically. In the case of cannabis testing, electronic upload to a track and trace system may be mandated.
