= Juliet Lapidos =

American writer and editor

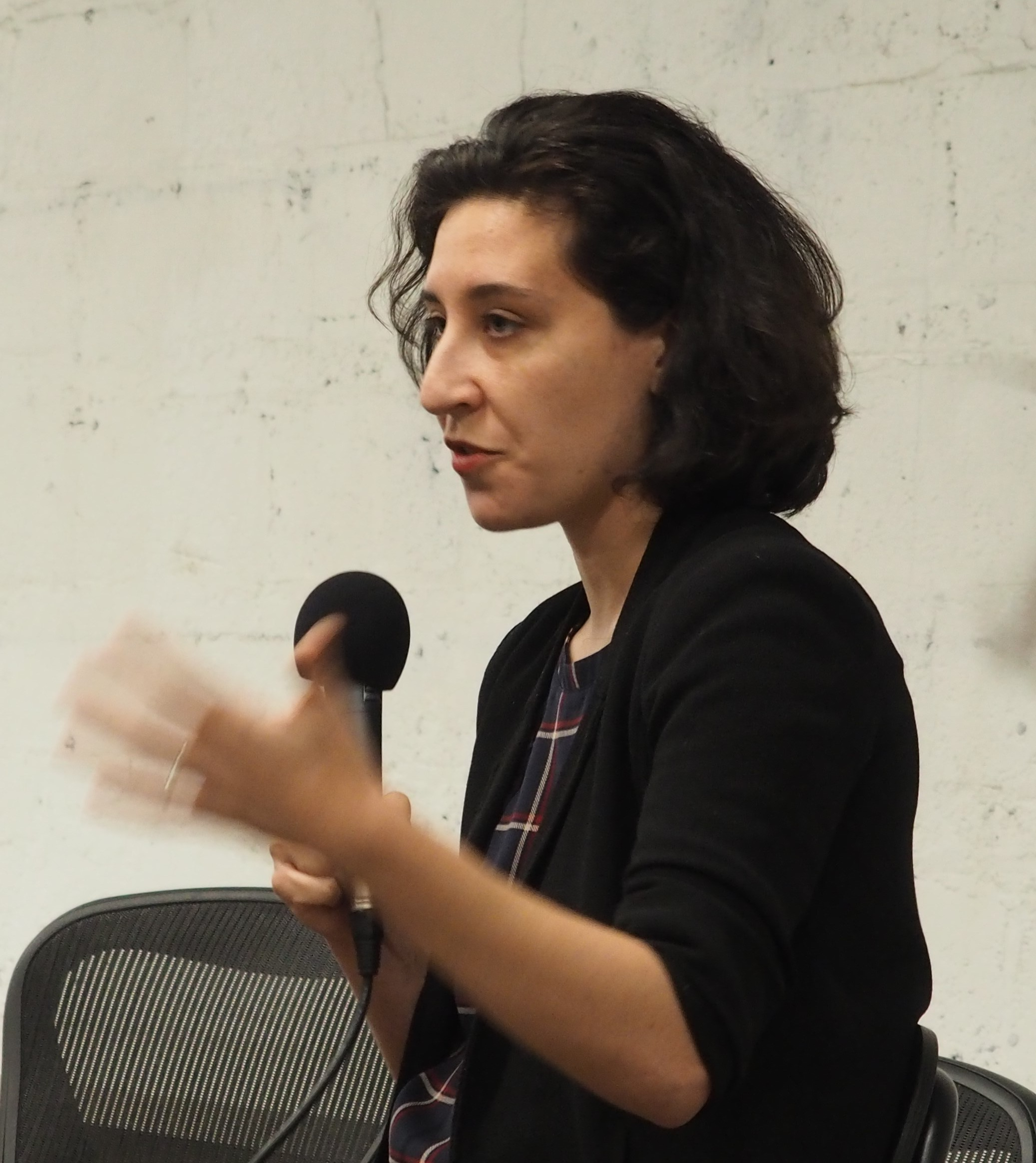
- Education: Yale University (BA); Hughes Hall, Cambridge (MPhil)
- Occupations: Writer, editor

Juliet Lapidos is an American writer and editor. Currently the Ideas editor at the Atlantic, she was previously the op-ed and Sunday opinion editor at the Los Angeles Times and a staff editor at the New York Times.

== Early life ==
Lapidos grew up in New York City. She is Jewish. Her parents immigrated to the United States and spoke French at home.

Lapidos graduated summa cum laude from Yale University and won a Gates Cambridge Scholarship, before earning a master's degree in English from Cambridge University.

== Career ==
Lapidos began her career as a culture editor at Slate, writing about friendship between men and women, Woody Allen, and the "Slate pitches" meme, among other topics. In 2011, she joined the New York Times as an opinion section staff editor. In 2015, she joined the Los Angeles Times as the editor of the op-ed page and the Sunday opinion section. In 2018 she left the Los Angeles Times to join the Atlantic as a senior editor.

Lapidos has written for The Atlantic, the New York Times Book Review, the New Yorker, and The Forward.

She is the author of the novel Talent, published by Little, Brown in the United States, Borough Press in the United Kingdom, and Bompiani in Italy.

== Works ==
- Talent, New York: Little, Brown and Company, 2019. ISBN 9780316480550, OCLC 1081305872
