= Sue Sisley =

American psychiatrist

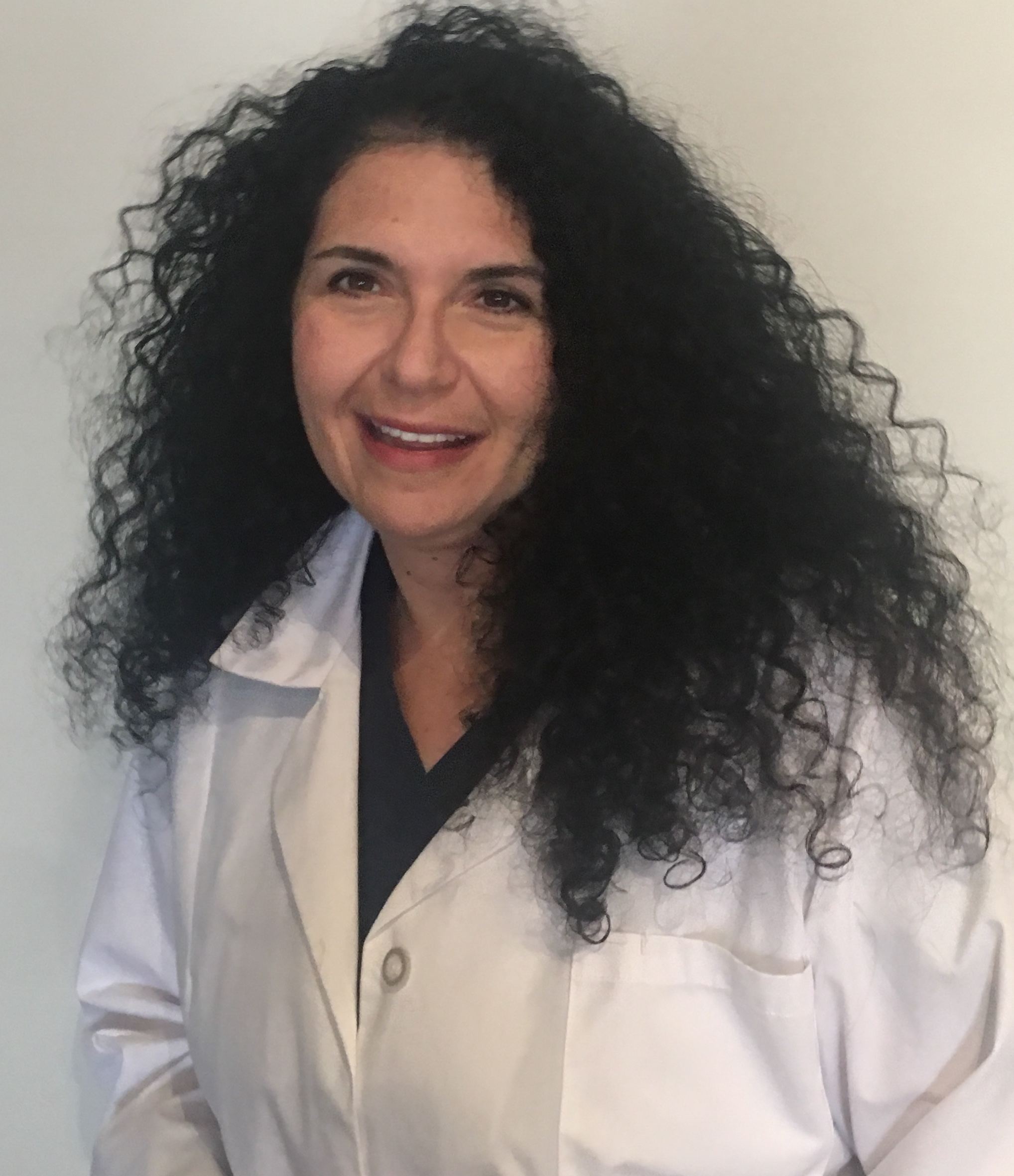
- Education: M.D. from University of Arizona College of Medicine
- Occupations: Researcher, Doctor
- Years active: 2009–present
- Known for: Cannabis and Psilocybin research

Suzanne A. Sisley is an American internist and psychiatrist who is a former clinical assistant professor at the University of Arizona College of Medicine. She was terminated from her position for her advocacy around ending barriers to schedule 1 drug research.

== Early life and education ==
Sisley was born and raised in Arizona. She earned her M.D. from the University of Arizona College of Medicine and completed a dual residency in Internal Medicine and Psychiatry at Good Samaritan Regional Medical Center.

== Career ==
In 2009, Sisley founded the Scottsdale Research Institute (SRI), an LLC focused on conducting FDA-approved clinical trials on plant-based medicines such as cannabis and psilocybin mushrooms. SRI has investigated treatments for PTSD, chronic pain, opioid dependence, and end-of-life anxiety.

In 2021, SRI became one of the first entities in the US to receive a DEA Schedule I manufacturing license to cultivate cannabis and psilocybin mushrooms for research, breaking a decades-long federal monopoly on cannabis research supply.

In March 2014, Sisley's proposal to study marijuana use to treat post-traumatic stress disorder (PTSD) was approved by the National Institute on Drug Abuse. After working at the University of Arizona for nearly eight years in various capacities, she was fired from the university in June 2014, ostensibly because of "funding and reorganization issues". Sisley, however, claims the firing was because of her interest in studying the potential medical uses of marijuana to treat PTSD. Sisley has also claimed that the university failed to provide a location for the trial to take place, and that the University of Arizona was "fearful of the word 'marijuana' and [did] not want... their brand aligned with this research." After she was terminated, the university released a statement saying that they had "not received political pressure to terminate any employee as has been suggested in some media and other reports." Internal correspondence later published by Truthdig suggested that Sisley directed veteran advocacy groups to lobby against her termination while publicly distancing herself from the ensuing political campaigns, drawing criticism from some veterans who participated in her studies.

=== Research ===
Sisley was principal investigator on the first FDA-approved randomized controlled trial assessing the safety and efficacy of smoked cannabis in military veterans with PTSD. The study was conducted in partnership with the Multidisciplinary Association for Psychedelic Studies (MAPS).

SRI received over $2.7 million in state funding to conduct the first FDA-approved clinical trials using whole psilocybin mushrooms, delivered via a standardized chocolate capsule.

=== Advocacy and policy ===
Sisley has advocated for reforming federal restrictions that hinder plant-based research. She publicly challenged the DEA's cannabis monopoly, filed multiple lawsuits to expand research access, and advised state lawmakers on medical cannabis legislation. She has supported bills such as Texas HB 3717, which proposes to legalize ibogaine research and treatment for PTSD and opioid dependence in Texas.

Sisley also serves as a member of Colorado's Natural Medicine Advisory Board.

== Honors and recognition ==
- Researcher of the Year – Multidisciplinary Association for Psychedelic Studies (MAPS), 2015
- Named one of "25 People Shaping the Future in Medicine and Policy" – Rolling Stone, 2022
- Profiled in Arizona Physician for contributions to medical freedom and underserved patient advocacy

== Selected publications ==
- Boehnke, Kevin F.; Scott, J. Ryan; Litinas, Evangelos; Sisley, Suzanne; Williams, David A.; Clauw, Daniel J. (2019-07-01). "Pills to Pot: Observational Analyses of Cannabis Substitution Among Medical Cannabis Users With Chronic Pain". The Journal of Pain. 20 (7): 830–841. doi:10.1016/j.jpain.2019.01.010. ISSN 1526-5900.
- Boehnke, Kevin F.; Scott, J. Ryan; Litinas, Evangelos; Sisley, Suzanne; Williams, David A.; Clauw, Daniel J. (2020-05-01). "High-Frequency Medical Cannabis Use Is Associated With Worse Pain Among Individuals With Chronic Pain". The Journal of Pain. 21 (5): 570–581. doi:10.1016/j.jpain.2019.09.006. ISSN 1526-5900. PMC 7089844.
- Bonn-Miller, Marcel O.; Sisley, Sue; Riggs, Paula; Yazar-Klosinski, Berra; Wang, Julie B.; Loflin, Mallory J. E.; Shechet, Benjamin; Hennigan, Colin; Matthews, Rebecca; Emerson, Amy; Doblin, Rick (2021). "The short-term impact of 3 smoked cannabis preparations versus placebo on PTSD symptoms: A randomized cross-over clinical trial". PLOS ONE. 16 (3) e0246990. Bibcode:2021PLoSO..1646990B. doi:10.1371/journal.pone.0246990. ISSN 1932-6203. PMC 7968689. PMID 33730032.
- Goff, Roman; Smith, Morgan; Islam, Sabrina; Sisley, Sue; Ferguson, Jonathan; Kuzdzal, Scott; Badal, Sunil; Kumar, Arun Babu; Sreenivasan, Uma; Schug, Kevin A. (2024-02-01). "Determination of psilocybin and psilocin content in multiple Psilocybe cubensis mushroom strains using liquid chromatography – tandem mass spectrometry". Analytica Chimica Acta. 1288 342161. Bibcode:2024AcAC.128842161G. doi:10.1016/j.aca.2023.342161. ISSN 0003-2670. PMID 38220293.
