= ASTM D37 =

Committee for developing technical standards for cannabis

ASTM International's Committee on Cannabis (D37) began developing technical standards for cannabis stakeholders in 2017. The committee was formed after a January conference hosted by American Public Health Association, an organizational meeting on Feb. 28 at ASTM International's global headquarters in West Conshohocken, Pennsylvania, and approval by the organization's board of directors on April 25. Americans for Safe Access (ASA) and many other organizations are partnering with ASTM International to develop seed-to-consumer quality standards that ASA say they hope become mandatory. D37 includes several subcommittees: indoor and outdoor horticulture and agriculture; quality management systems; laboratory; processing and handling; security and transportation; and personnel training, assessment, and credentialing.
