= Cannabis industry =

Legal cultivators, producers, consumers, and associated services

The cannabis industry is composed of legal cultivators and producers, consumers, independent industrial standards bodies, ancillary products and services, regulators and researchers concerning cannabis and its industrial derivative, hemp. The cannabis industry has been inhibited by regulatory restrictions for most of its recent history, but the legal market has emerged rapidly as more governments legalize medical and adult use. Uruguay became the first country to legalize recreational marijuana through legislation in December, 2013. Canada became the first country to legalize private sales of recreational marijuana with Bill C-45 in 2018.

== Market value ==
The world economic market has been broken down as follows, showing that the cannabis industry can be considered a multibillion-dollar component of a larger pharmaceutical industry. The exact value of cannabis sales worldwide remains unknown as the vast majority of the market remains illicit. With movement around legalisation of Cannabis, it is attracting more investments from alcohol and drug companies.

Market		Order-of-magnitude value
Drug	Non-medical drug ("recreational")	hundreds of billions
Drug	Medical leaf and flower	tens of billions
Drug	Refined pharmaceuticals	Billions
Hemp food-fiber	Oilseed	hundreds of millions
Hemp food-fiber	Fiber	tens of millions
Hemp food-fiber	Biomass	hundreds of thousands
Other	Phytoremediation	tens of thousands
Other	Ornamental	Thousands
From Small (2016)

=== United States ===
Marijuana (drug) sales in North America reached $6.7 billion in 2016, representing 30% growth year-over-year. According to a report by university researcher Jon Gettman, cannabis is the United States' largest cash crop and "a pervasive and ineradicable part of the national economy". A 2015 ArcView Group report stated that it was the fastest growing industry in the United States. The industry in the United States is expected to grow from $2 billion in 2014 to as much as $10 billion in 2018, depending on legalization outcomes. By one estimate the industry in the United States could be $35 billion in 2020. The legal market is estimated to be more than $10 billion as of September 2020, and a report by Morningstar predicts, "nearly 25% average annual growth for the U.S. recreational market and nearly 15% for the medical market through 2030."

According to GQ magazine in mid-2017, it was the second largest cash crop in the U.S., after corn, and worth over $40 billion.

The national (non-psychoactive) hemp market was $600 million in 2015, Accurate predictions of potential future legal markets for hemp are deemed impossible to predict due to "the absence since the 1950s of any commercial and unrestricted hemp production in the United States".

In a Huffington Post interview, Mark Kleiman, the "Pot Czar" of Washington state, said he was concerned that the National Cannabis Industry Association would favor profits over public health. He also said that it could become a predatory body like the lobbying arms of the tobacco and alcohol industries. Kleiman said: "The fact that the National Cannabis Industry Association has hired itself a K Street suit [lobbyist] is not a good sign."

United States financial institutions, CPAs, and lawyers struggle with conflicting advice from NASBA and Treasury over their risks to provide services to the legal cannabis industry. The contradiction between the federal Controlled Substances Act and local or state legalization is called "the single most defining characteristic of the [cannabis] industry".

=== Uruguay ===
Cannabis in Uruguay was legalized for adult use in December 2013. Sales of marijuana are regulated through government distribution with a state-mandated price of $1.30 per gram. Access to marijuana is legal through four sources: medical marijuana through the Ministry of Health, home-grown marijuana, membership clubs, and sales to adults in drugstores.

=== Canada ===
Canada became the second country to legalize cannabis for adult use on October 17, 2018. As of December 2017, there were 79 licensed marijuana producers in Canada with most concentrated in Ontario and British Columbia. According Deloitte, the base retail market is valued at $4.9-$8.7 billion annually. Including ancillary opportunities, Deloitte estimates a market worth $12.7-$22.6 billion annually, demonstrating an upside of more than $20 billion.

=== Ancillary products and services ===
The cannabis industry is supported by a network of ancillary products and services that do not "touch the plant". The most common ancillary services are professional services followed by information services, banking services, and security solutions. Cultivation structures, installments, and equipment are the most common ancillary products followed by consumption devices, paraphernalia, packaging, processing equipment, software, security equipment, and laboratory supplies. The addition of ancillary products and services amounts to an economic impact that is estimated at four times the value of direct sales of cannabis. Based on this multiplier, the total economic impact of the cannabis industry in the United States was $16-$18 billion in 2016 and is expected to reach $47.6-$68.4 billion by 2021.

=== Related industries ===
Cannabis has entered the restaurant industry in certain legal markets.

== University involvement ==
Involvement from universities has increased as the industry gains legitimacy worldwide. Northern Michigan University initiated their Medicinal Plant Chemistry Program in 2017, the first undergraduate degree program preparing students for work related to the production, analysis, and distribution of medicinal plants. Daniele Piomelli, a professor at University of California, Irvine, developed an interdisciplinary cannabis research program called the Institute for the Study of Cannabis with the mission to advance cannabis knowledge in academia.

Green Wolverine, founded at the University of Michigan's Ross School of Business in 2017, is a nonprofit corporation composed of university student organizations centered on acquiring knowledge related to legal business activities in the cannabis industry. The mission is to discover opportunities for success for university students in cannabis or related fields through education, networking, and recruiting.

Hocking College (Nelsonville, OH) has an accredited Cannabis Lab Technician associate degree as part of their Lab Sciences Program. It was developed by Dr. Jonathan Cachat in 2018.

== Administration and regulatory involvement ==
The Agricultural Technical Advisory Committees offer technical advice and information on specific product sectors to the Secretary of Agriculture and the U.S. Trade Representative on negotiating objectives and positions, and other matters related to the development and administration of U.S. agricultural trade policy. In 2023, one of the six Agricultural Technical Advisory Committees was renamed "Tobacco, Cotton, Peanuts, and Hemp" to recognize the position of hemp in the post-prohibition U.S. agriculture economy.

Congress established the advisory committee system in 1974 to ensure U.S. agricultural trade policy objectives reflect U.S. commercial and economic interests. The U.S. Department of Agriculture (USDA) and U.S. Trade Representative (USTR) jointly manage the committees.

The Agricultural Policy Advisory Committee has senior representatives from across the agricultural community and provides advice on general trade policy matters.

== Cannabis accessories ==
Selling accessories related to cannabis is not explicitly illegal in most countries, and such products have been gaining popularity for several decades. As legal cannabis continues to spread, accessory sales have been growing rapidly.

== Women in the industry ==
Most research, both governmental and privately funded, does not investigate women's roles and placement within the extremely lucrative and growing marijuana industry. Women have been historically blocked and subjugated to "feminine" work in the cannabis industry. According to the report Women & Minorities in the Marijuana Industry, "The percentage of women holding executive positions at cannabis businesses has fallen considerably over the past two years – down 9 percentage points from a previous Marijuana Business Daily survey conducted in October 2015 – though it remains higher than the average across the larger U.S. business landscape."

There is often little to no mention of women among cannabis businesses in statistical reporting or business journals unless the focus is specifically on women or minorities. Since the first states in the U.S., Colorado and Washington, legalized marijuana in 2012, the industry has undergone extreme growth both in terms of wealth, and in terms of employment. In 2017 only 26.9% of executive positions in the industry were held by women. Also in 2017, the legal adult cannabis industry in the United States was worth around $7.7 billion and annual sales were expected to grow more to more than $24 billion by 2025. Slightly more current data by Forbes Magazine's 2019 survey of 166 cannabis businesses in 17 different states across the America finds that 38.5% of employees self-identified as female. While this number clearly rose since 2017, unfortunately the number of women who held "Director" or "Executive" roles in 2017 dropped to only 17.6%. Shockingly, 74% of companies surveyed have 10% or fewer female-identifying employees. More than 12% of the 166 companies had no females in "Director" or "Executive" positions while over 41% of them only had one woman in those categories. In 2021, Leafly, trusted cannabis education and location website, released their yearly job report stating that the legal cannabis industry supports 321,000 jobs with more than 77,000 new jobs created since 2020. While about 38% of women suffer from chronic diseases, only 4% of research and funds are used towards women's healthcare and services. This leaves women to seek out alternative therapies. Given that women make up around 85% of all consumers purchasing and 85% of healthcare decisions, “women are central to the currently semi-legal developing cannabis market.” As females are consuming cannabis at higher rates than ever before, there is huge purchasing power related to health and wellness decision. The rapid growth of the industry presented by these number demonstrates it is essential to consider women in this industry as their purchasing power is the strongest when compared to other demographics.

Circling back to the earlier years of the industry (prior to wider legalization in the US around 2010), women were commonly pushed into more "feminine" work such as tending crops, trimming, clone work, and other more tedious tasks. The separation of women into these types of female ascribed work, contributed to a long history of gender-based barriers faced by women in the cannabis industry both in access to employment, raises, and equal pay. These gender-based barriers are key to examining women's place and access to the industry in present day, which is often overlooked or goes unacknowledged. Understanding women's historic and current place within the cannabis industry is key for all those a part of the industry as well as those interested in joining the industry, to combat discrimination and prejudice in the rapidly growing market.

In more recent years of the industry (from 2010 to 2021), some have theorized women's role within the industry is changing and argue the industry has become female friendly. This claim is disputed among scholars as some find women to be less concerned about risk factors than in the early years of the industry. As the cannabis industry continues to grow, there is evidence of higher numbers of female owners and executives compared with other United States businesses as a whole. According to data analysis expert Giadha DeCarcer, "The cannabis industry is so new that there are very few barriers to get in, especially for women [entrepreneurs]". It seems that women in the industry, in some ways, are starting to perform opposite to prior literature, displaying increased appeal for uncertainty and risk which is common among this industry. While the new evidence within the industry demonstrates growing numbers of women and confidence against unpredictability, which some could infer as greater access, there are still many gender-based barrier present in the industry that block women from equal treatment and acquirement.

== See also ==
- ASTM D37 – Committee for developing technical standards for cannabis
- Cannabis political parties – Political parties advocating cannabis legalization
- Cannabis product testing – Testing of the properties of cannabis destined for consumer use
- Cannabis rights – Legal protections for marijuana consumers
- Industrial Hemp Research Program – Production and legality of hemp in the US state
- List of cannabis companies – Companies in the cannabis industry
- List of celebrities who own cannabis businesses
- List of hemp products – Products using hemp as a component material
- Green rush – Economic events & activities following legalization of marijuana in the U.S.
- Cannabis advertising – Advertising of cannabis products to consumers

== Sources ==
- Small, Ernest (November 2016). "The commercial marijuana revolution". Cannabis: A Complete Guide. CRC Press. p. 554. ISBN 978-1498761635. (chapter 15)
