= List of cannabis rights leaders =

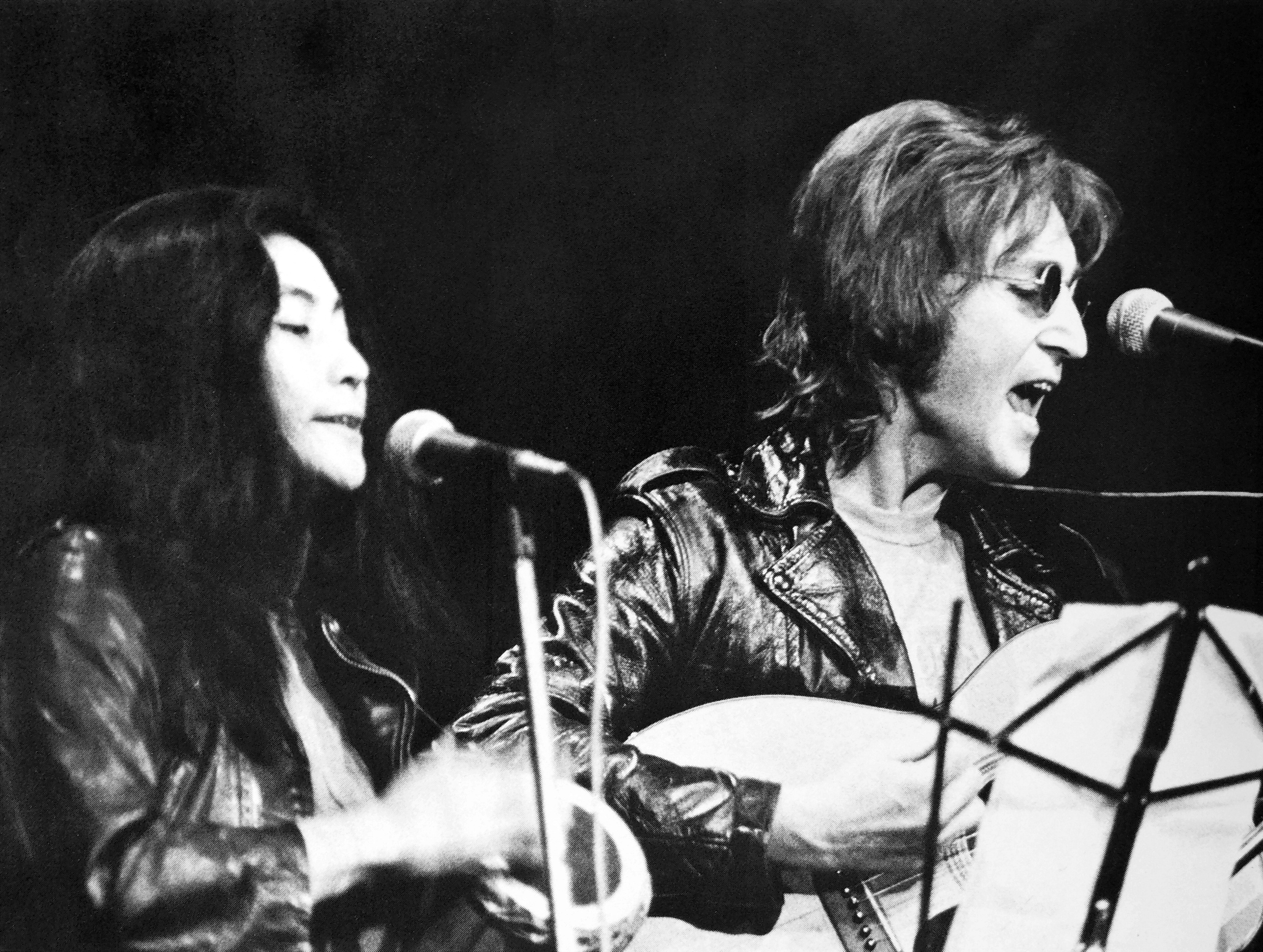
Yoko Ono and John Lennon at John Sinclair Freedom Rally

Following is a list of cannabis rights leaders, and activists in the cannabis legalization movement, including business leaders and celebrities who advocate for ending cannabis prohibition:

== Cannabis rights leaders ==
Cannabis rights leaders, listed by country:

== Argentina ==
- Matías Faray

== Australia ==
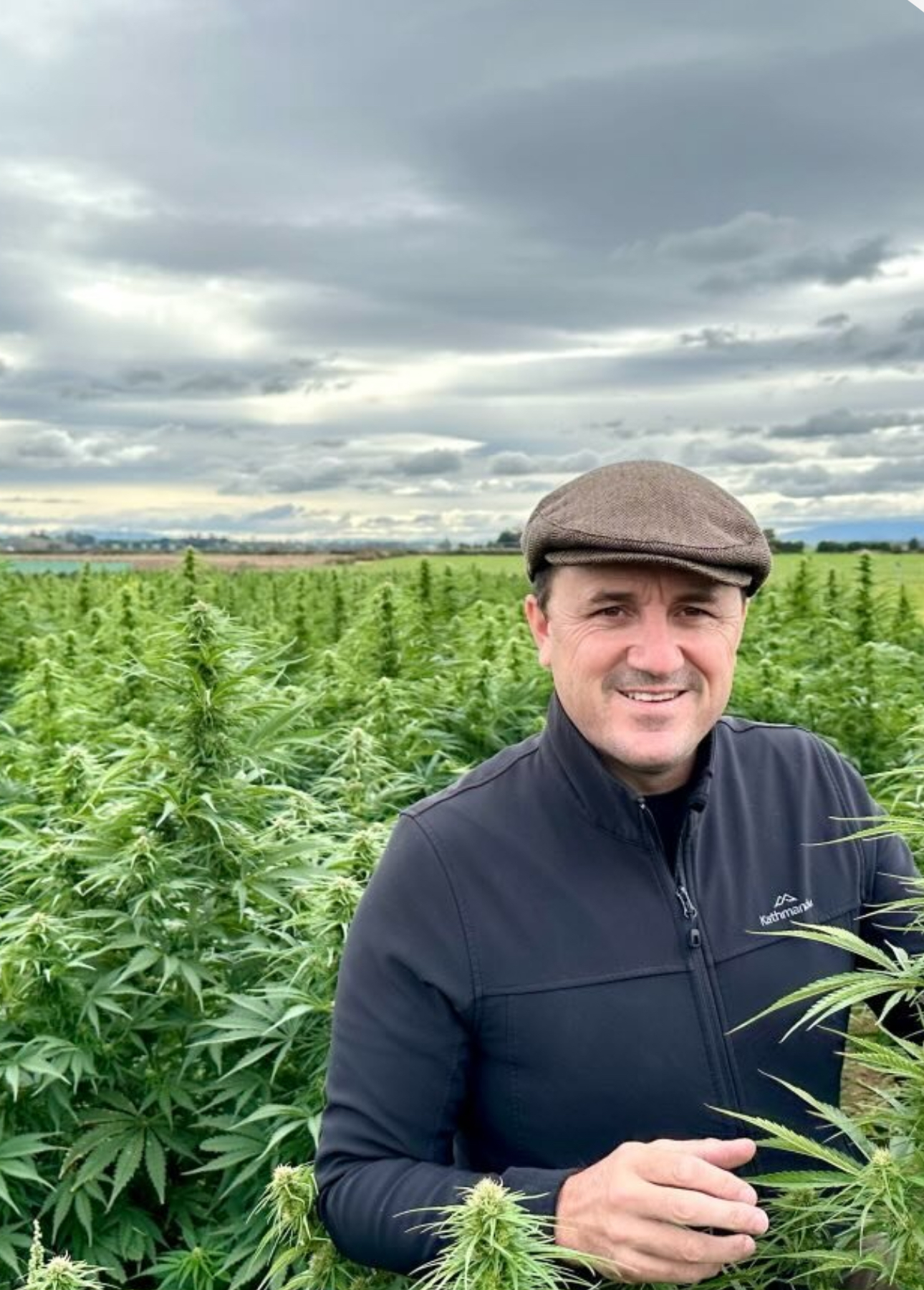
Jeremy Buckingham, elected Legalise Cannabis Australia New South Wales Legislative Council member, 2023

- Michael Balderstone
- Richard Friar
- Nevil Schoenmakers
- Blake “ChillinIT” Turnell

== Canada ==
- Riley Cote
- Jodie Emery
- Marc Emery
- Mike Harcourt
- Grant Krieger
- Dana Larsen
- Blair Longley
- Ron Mann
- Abi Roach
- Seth Rogen
- Caryma Sa'd
- Marc-Boris St-Maurice
- Hugô St-Onge
- Brian Taylor
- John Turmel
- Val Venis

== Czech Republic ==
- Lukáš Hurt
- Bob Hýsek

== France ==
- Jean-Pierre Galland
- Farid Ghehiouèche
- Safia Lebdi
- Michel Sitbon

== Germany ==
- Angela Gossow
- Georg Wurth

== Hungary ==
- Juhász Péter

== Ireland ==
- Ubi Dwyer
- Luke "Ming" Flanagan
- Gino Kenny
- William Brooke O'Shaughnessy

== Israel ==
- Raphael Mechoulam

== Jamaica ==
- Bob Marley
- Peter Tosh

== Japan ==
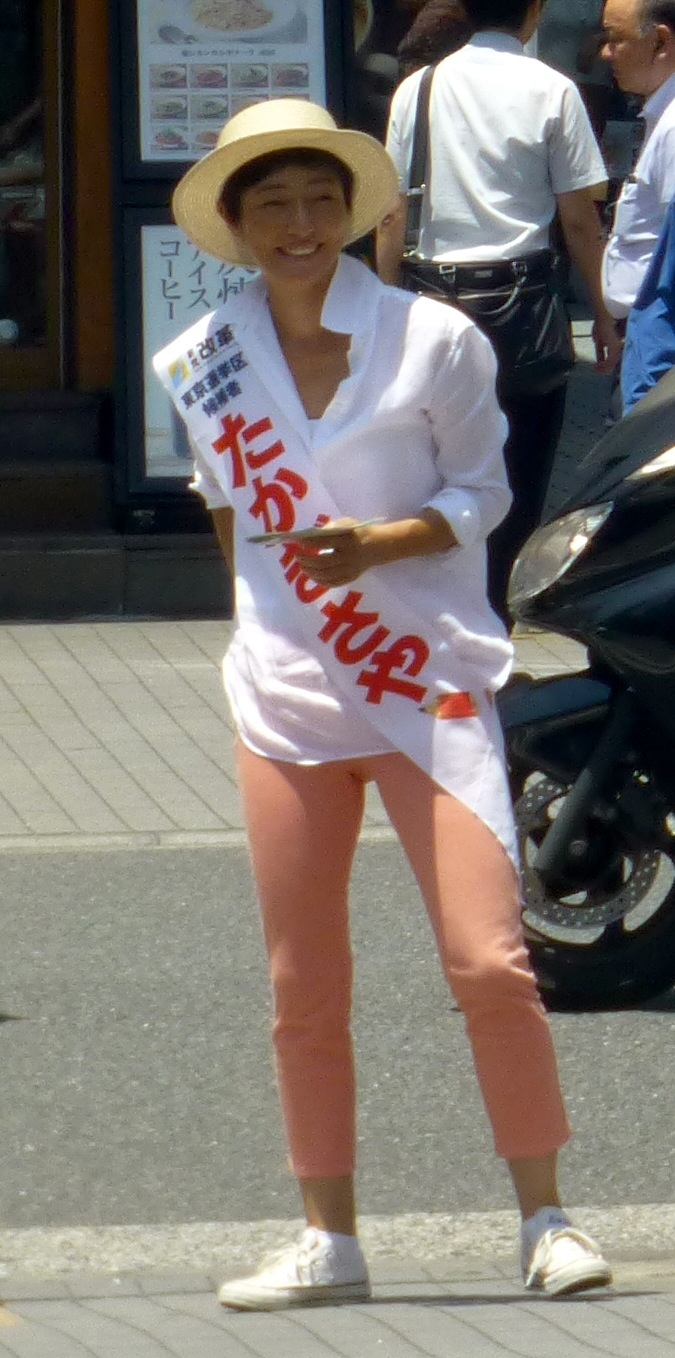
Saya Takagi campaigning in Japan, 2016

- Saya Takagi
- Junichi Takayasu

== Morocco ==
- Abdellatif Adebibe

== Netherlands ==
- Frits Bolkestein
- Dries van Agt
- Herman George "Armand" van Loenhout
- Simon Vinkenoog

== New Zealand ==
- Michael Appleby
- Abe Gray
- Dakta Green
- Rose Renton
- Chlöe Swarbrick
- Nándor Tánczos
- Metiria Turei

== Norway ==
- Thorvald Stoltenberg

== South Africa ==
- Lee Harris

== Spain ==
- Antonio Escohotado
- Fernanda de la Figuera
- Albert Tió

== Sweden ==
- Joar Forssell
- Nyamko Sabuni
- Sara Skyttedal

== United Kingdom ==
- Stephen Abrams
- Richard Branson
- Paul Flynn
- George Harrison
- Clare Hodges
- Norman Lamb
- John Lennon
- Howard Marks
- Don Barry Mason
- Paul McCartney
- Ringo Starr
- Dean "Black the Ripper" West
- Kevin Williamson

== United States ==
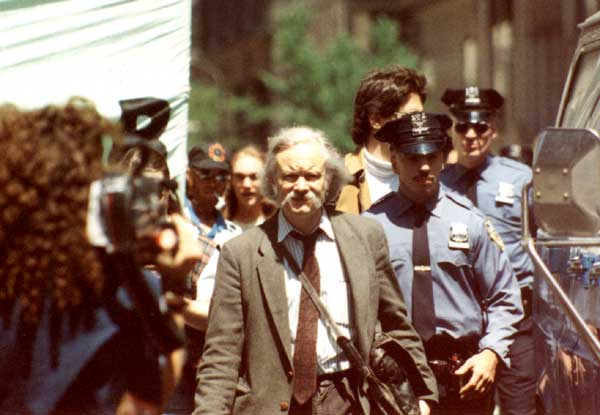
Dana Beal in 1994 New York City Million Marijuana March

Rick Steves speaking at Seattle Hempfest, 2010

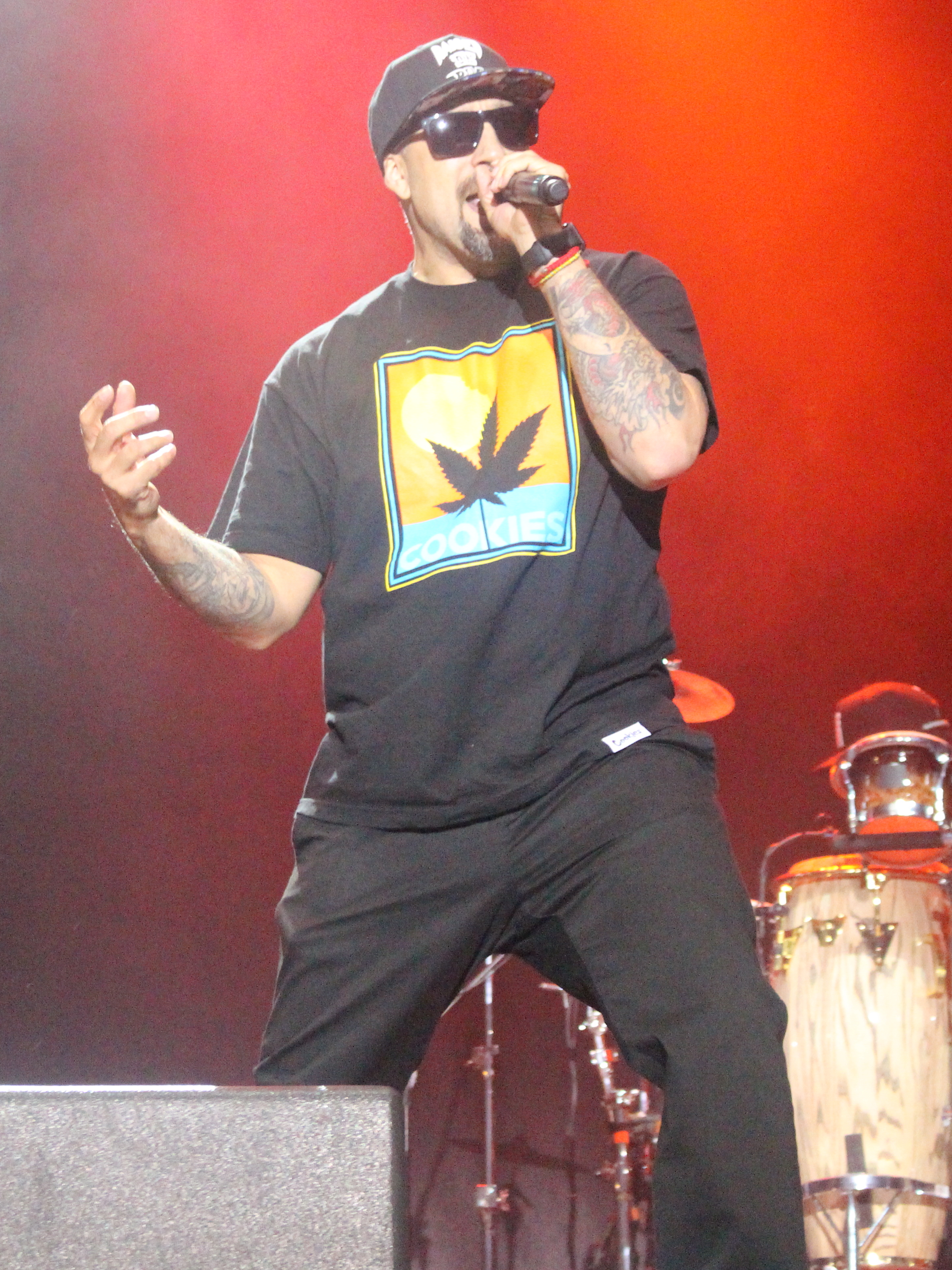
B-Real performing at Nova Rock, in 2016, wearing cannabis attire

American cannabis rights leaders, listed by state:

=== Alabama ===
- Loretta Nall

=== Alaska ===
- Charlo Greene
- Irwin Ravin

=== Arizona ===
- Caroline Killeen
- Jake Plummer

=== Arkansas ===
- Joycelyn Elders

=== California ===
- Tom Ammiano
- Nicole Aniston
- Paul Armentano
- Ngaio Bealum
- Doug Benson
- Eddie Bravo
- Calvin "Snoop Dogg" Broadus Jr.
- Jay Cavanaugh
- Tommy Chong
- Chris Conrad
- Valerie Corral
- Steve DeAngelo
- Nate Diaz
- Nick Diaz
- Lowell Eggemeier
- Scott Feil
- Louis "B-Real" Freese
- Fred Gardner
- James Gray
- Al Harrington
- Jack Herer
- Jay Evan "Laganja Estranja" Jackson
- George Clayton Johnson
- Paul Kantner
- Paul Krassner
- Steve Kubby
- Kyle Kushman
- Timothy Leary
- Barbara Lee
- Richard Lee
- Lucky Lehrer
- Charles C. Lynch
- Seth MacFarlane
- Allison Margolin
- Terence McKenna
- Jim McMahon
- Peter McWilliams
- Steve McWilliams
- Christine "Sister Kate" Meeusen
- Tod Mikuriya
- Mikki Norris
- Dennis Peron
- Michelle Phillips
- Mary Jane "Brownie Mary" Rathbun
- Rudy Reyes
- Seth Rogen
- Henry Rollins
- Ed Rosenthal
- Jerry Rubin
- Frank Shamrock
- Cheryl Shuman
- John Sperling
- Kyle Turley
- Marc Wasserman
- Robert Anton Wilson
- George Zimmer

=== Colorado ===
- William "Wayward Bill" Chengelis
- Krystal Gabel
- Rachel K. Gillette
- Ken Gorman
- Steven Hager
- Christian Hageseth
- Nate Jackson
- Wanda James
- Laura Kriho
- Sal Pace
- Jessica Peck
- Jared Polis
- Mason Tvert
- Brian Vicente
- Marvin Washington
- Jane West

=== Florida ===
- Steve Berke
- Eben Britton
- Mike James
- Norm Kent
- Peter B. Lewis
- John Morgan
- Robert Randall

=== Georgia ===
- Sanjay Gupta
- Cheryl Miller
- Asher Roth

=== Hawaii ===
- Roger Christie
- Woody Harrelson
- Andrew Simmons

=== Illinois ===
- Mezz Mezzrow
- Jim "Chef Ra" Wilson Jr.

=== Iowa ===
- George McMahon

=== Kansas ===
- Shona Banda

=== Kentucky ===
- Dan Jack Combs
- Gatewood Galbraith
- Dakota Meyer

=== Maryland ===
- Montel Williams
- Kevin Zeese

=== Massachusetts ===
- Constance Bumgarner Gee
- Jack A. Cole
- Greta Gaines
- Lester Grinspoon
- Vermin Love Supreme
- Daniel "Danny Danko" Vinkovetsky

=== Michigan ===
- Tom Crosslin
- John Sinclair

=== Minnesota ===
- John Birrenbach
- Jim Carlson
- Tim Davis
- James "Jesse Ventura" Janos
- Paula Overby
- Dennis Schuller
- Will Shetterly
- Chris Wright

=== Nebraska ===
- Donald Fiedler

=== Nevada ===
- Joseph N. Crowley

=== New Hampshire ===
- Evalyn Merrick
- Abdullah Saeed

=== New Jersey ===
- Cory Booker
- Ed "NJWeedman" Forchion
- David L. Nathan

=== New Mexico ===
- Gary Johnson

=== New York ===
- Dana Beal
- Steve Bloom
- Kristin M. Davis
- Jacqueline "Coca Crystal" Diamond
- Ann Druyan
- Abby Epstein
- Allen Ginsberg
- Gary "Tom Forçade" Goodson
- Abbie Hoffman
- Thomas K. Leighton
- Bill Maher
- Ethan Nadelmann
- Anthony Papa
- David Peel
- Carl Sagan
- Ed Sanders
- Larry Sharpe
- Steven Hager

=== North Carolina ===
- Sean Haugh

=== Ohio ===
- John Boehner
- Steve Conliff

=== Oregon ===
- Earl Blumenauer
- Madeline Martinez
- Elvy Musikka
- Clifford Robinson
- Malcom Gregory Scott
- Allen St. Pierre
- Paul Stanford
- George "Jorge Cervantes" Van Patten

=== Pennsylvania ===
- Gisele Fetterman
- Kiyoshi Kuromiya
- Maj Toure

=== South Dakota ===
- Alex White Plume

=== Tennessee ===
- Stephen Gaskin
- Derrick Morgan

=== Texas ===
- Barry Cooper
- Brian Cuban
- Joe Gaddy
- Larry Hagman
- Ann Lee
- Willie Nelson
- Joe Ptak
- Brett Stahl
- Jeffrey "Zeal" Stefanoff
- Mark Stepnoski

=== Vermont ===
- Cris Ericson
- Robert Melamede

=== Virginia ===
- Arthur Kleps
- Michael Krawitz
- Eugene Monroe

=== Washington ===
- Alison Holcomb
- Vivian McPeak
- Norm Stamper
- Rick Steves
- Karen Stratton

=== Washington, D.C. ===
- Erik Altieri
- Richard Cowan
- Adam Eidinger
- Rob Kampia
- Nikolas Schiller
- Keith Stroup
- William Creighton Woodward

=== West Virginia ===
- Jon Gettman

=== Wisconsin ===
- Ben Masel
- Jacki Rickert

== See also ==
- List of cannabis rights organizations
