= Liberal Libertarian Party =

Political party in Argentina

Liberal Libertarian Partido Liberal Libertario
- President: Gonzalo Blousson
- Founded: June 22, 2009; 16 years ago
- Dissolved: 2014
- Succeeded by: Libertarian Party
- Headquarters: Buenos Aires, Argentina
- Ideology: Libertarianism; Classical liberalism Laissez-faire; Non-aggression principle
- International affiliation: Interlibertarians

Website
- www.liberallibertario.org

The Liberal Libertarian Party (Spanish: Partido Liberal Libertario) was a political party from Argentina founded in 2009. It defines itself both as a classical liberal and libertarian party. Its political platform advocates limited government, free markets and individual liberties including freedom of religion, freedom of speech, freedom of the press, right to privacy and strong civil liberties. It advocates the values of the 1853 Constitution.

Its goals are to limit the government intrusion on individual liberty, reduce government spending, lower taxes for Argentinians, balance the budget, reduce regulations and promote free trade. Their slogan is "Individual rights, free market and non-aggression."

The party emphasizes the role of free markets and individual achievement as the primary factors behind economic prosperity. To this end, they favor laissez-faire economics, fiscal conservatism, and the promotion of personal responsibility over welfare programs. A leading economic theory advocated is supply-side economics. The party has been morally opposed to increasing the public debt and raising taxes, and proposed to reduce government spending as an alternative.

== History ==
The party started after a group of people discussed in a Facebook group called "I want a liberal party in Argentina" (Spanish: Quiero que exista un partido liberal en la Argentina). Note that the word "liberal" referred to classical liberalism as opposed to modern liberalism. Because of the lack of representation in the country's government, the group decided to create their own party.

Judge María Romilda Servini de Cubría is handling the legal recognition of the newly created party. The party campaigned to get 4000 members in order to be able to take part in the 2013 election.

== Protests ==
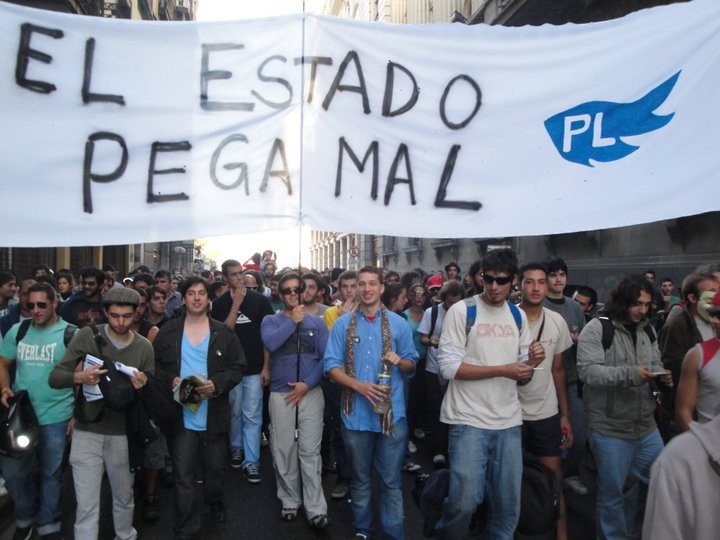
PL members at the Global Marihuana March in Buenos Aires

The Liberal Libertarian Party has been criticizing the policies implemented in Argentina since their foundation (e.g., doing a parody of an advertisement about taxes), but the party acquired media attention in March 2011 when they asked Buenos Aires governor Mauricio Macri to lift a ruling on motels which doesn't allow the entrance of more than two people per room, arguing it was a violation of private property rights. The party said it should be up to the owner to decide the admission policies of his business, and not the State.

The party suggested closing the CONEAU (National Commission for University Evaluation and Accreditation) arguing it's not only a misuse of taxpayers money but also an affront to academic independence. They also protested against the state public founding of the TV program named "6,7,8" alleging taxpayers should not fund official propaganda.

In April 2011, a controversy rise when Horacio González, director of the national library, ask to avoid choosing Nobel Prize in Literature Mario Vargas Llosa as the inaugural speaker at the Buenos Aires International Book Fair after Vargas Llosa criticized the Argentine government. On the inauguration day, party members show up and held a demonstration in support of Vargas Llosa, who gave the inaugural speech without incidents.

In May 2011, party members took part in the Global Marijuana March in Buenos Aires under the slogan The State is a bad trip (Spanish: El Estado pega mal). The Liberal Libertarian Party support marijuana legalization claiming the State should respect individual actions as long they do not harm another individual's freedom. The party argue that prohibition violates article 19 of the constitution They also demanded dismissal of the charges against Matías Faray, who was detained for cannabis cultivation.

On July 1, the party went to the main building of Argentina's tax agency AFIP (English: Federal Administration of Public Income) to protest in a pacific way against the high tax rate. They did a symbolic closure of the tax agency as a celebration of Tax Freedom Day. Also the party criticized the Federal Coparticipation law, the use of taxpayers money on funding bankrupted airline Aerolíneas Argentinas and the use of retiree's money on Soccer for Everybody (Spanish: Fútbol para todos).

In January 2012, the party criticized the government's smart card SUBE (Spanish: Sistema Único de Boleto Electrónico, English: Unique Electronic Ticket System), a card used to travel by bus, train, and subway. A citizen who doesn't use the government's SUBE card is required to pay a higher price for the ticket. As people are required to give personal information to the government in order to obtain these cards, and as the card logs the date, time, and location of each ride, the Liberal Libertarian Party said the card constitutes an encroachment by the government against the privacy of citizens. They proposed an exchange of cards between users as a form of peaceful protest. Months later, controversy arose when an independent newspaper found irregularities in the call for bids process of SUBE as it cost $10 million (ARS) more than the second most expensive bid. After the press found fake employees with fake résumés and a fake office address, the government decided to cancel the contract with the company that supervised the card.

From May 2012, Argentina's tax agency (AFIP) forced banks to ask authorization in order to sell United States dollars to citizens. The buyer must notify to AFIP his income and they decide how many dollars he can buy. Also, the foreign currency market is restricted to entities approved by the Central Bank. This restrictions to buy dollars led to an increase in black market activity. The party believes the people has the constitutional right to use and dispose their private property as they wish, so they protested against the restrictions by buying/selling dollars in small units to the public, without proper government authorization, at Buenos Aires Central Business District. AFIP security agents were present at the beginning of the protest but left when the media arrived. The original protest won the attention of the national press and a few news agencies from other countries.
