= Abi Roach =

Canadian cannabis entrepreneur

- Born: 1983 or 1984 (age 40–41)
- Occupations: Cannabis entrepreneur and advocate
- Years active: 2003–present
- Employer: Ontario Cannabis Retail Corporation
- Organization: Cannabis Friendly Business Association

Abi Roach (born 1983 or 1984) is a Canadian cannabis entrepreneur and advocate for the reform of cannabis in Ontario and Canada.

== Early life ==
Roach was born in Haifa, Israel 1983 or 1984.

== Career ==
Roach is a Canadian cannabis entrepreneur. She has owned the Cannabis retail outlet Roach-o-Rama, and since 2012, a cannabis-tourism business in Saint Ann, Jamaica. She was the publisher of the (now defunct) Spliff free cannabis news magazine.

Roach was the owner-operator of the Kensington Market, Toronto-based cannabis lounge Hotbox Cafe from 2003 until she sold the business to Friendly Stranger Holdings Corp in 2020. The business was North America's longest running Cannabis-consumption business space and opened the day after ownership of cannabis was decriminalised in Ontario.

Roach is an advocate for cannabis law reform, and in 2016 was an organiser for the Cannabis Friendly Business Association. In November 2017, she spoke before a Government of Ontario committee, advocating for a relaxation of laws that govern where cannabis can be consumed. Roach was critical of the Government of Ontario's distribution of Cannabis licences via a lottery system, before taking a job at the government's Ontario Cannabis Retail Corporation.

== Personal life ==
In 2019, Roach lives in Kensington Market, Toronto.

== See also ==
- Cannabis in Ontario
- Cannabis in Canada
- Cannabis Act
