= ADPF 187 =

Landmark case of the Supreme Court of Brazil

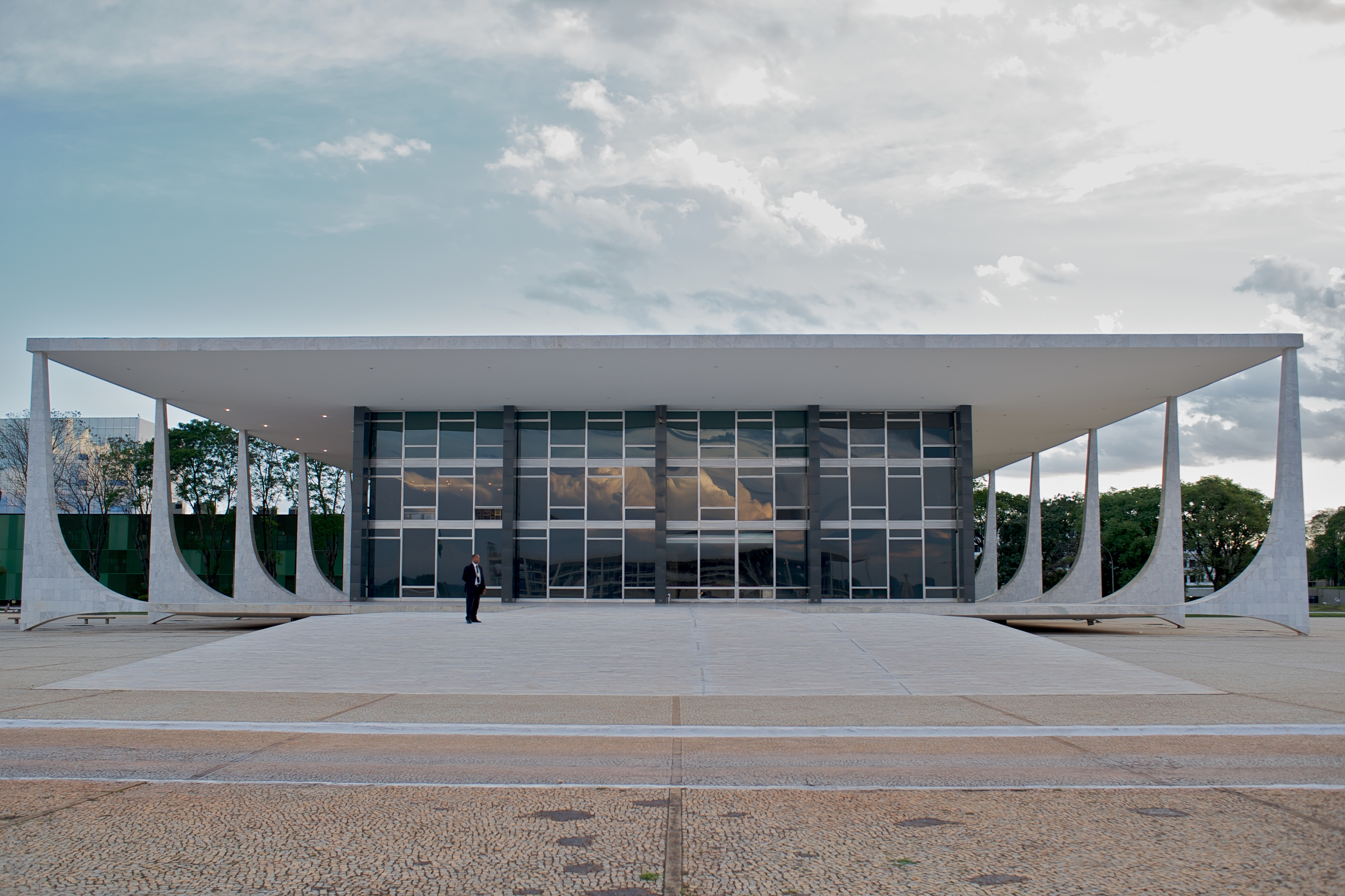
- Court: Supreme Federal Court
- Full case name: ADPF 187 (Prosecutor General v. President of the Republic)
- Decided: June 15, 2011
- Citation: Supreme Court of Brazil permitted the protests in favor of decriminalization of drugs in the country

Court membership
- Judges sitting: President Cezar Peluso Justices: Celso de Mello; Ayres Britto; Cármen Lúcia; Ricardo Lewandowski; Ellen Gracie; Luiz Fux; Marco Aurélio Mello

Case opinions
- Decision by: Mello
- Concurrence: Peluzo, Britto, Lúcia, Lewandowski, Gracie, Fux and Mello

Keywords
- Cannabis rights; Legality of cannabis; Cannabis in Brazil

ADPF 187 (June 15, 2011), is a landmark Brazil Supreme Court case. The rapporteur Celso de Mello voted in favor of protests of decriminalization of drugs.

== Right ==
After of the decision of the Supreme Court, the people will not be penalized:

- People can to protest in favor of decriminalization of drugs.

== High Court decision ==
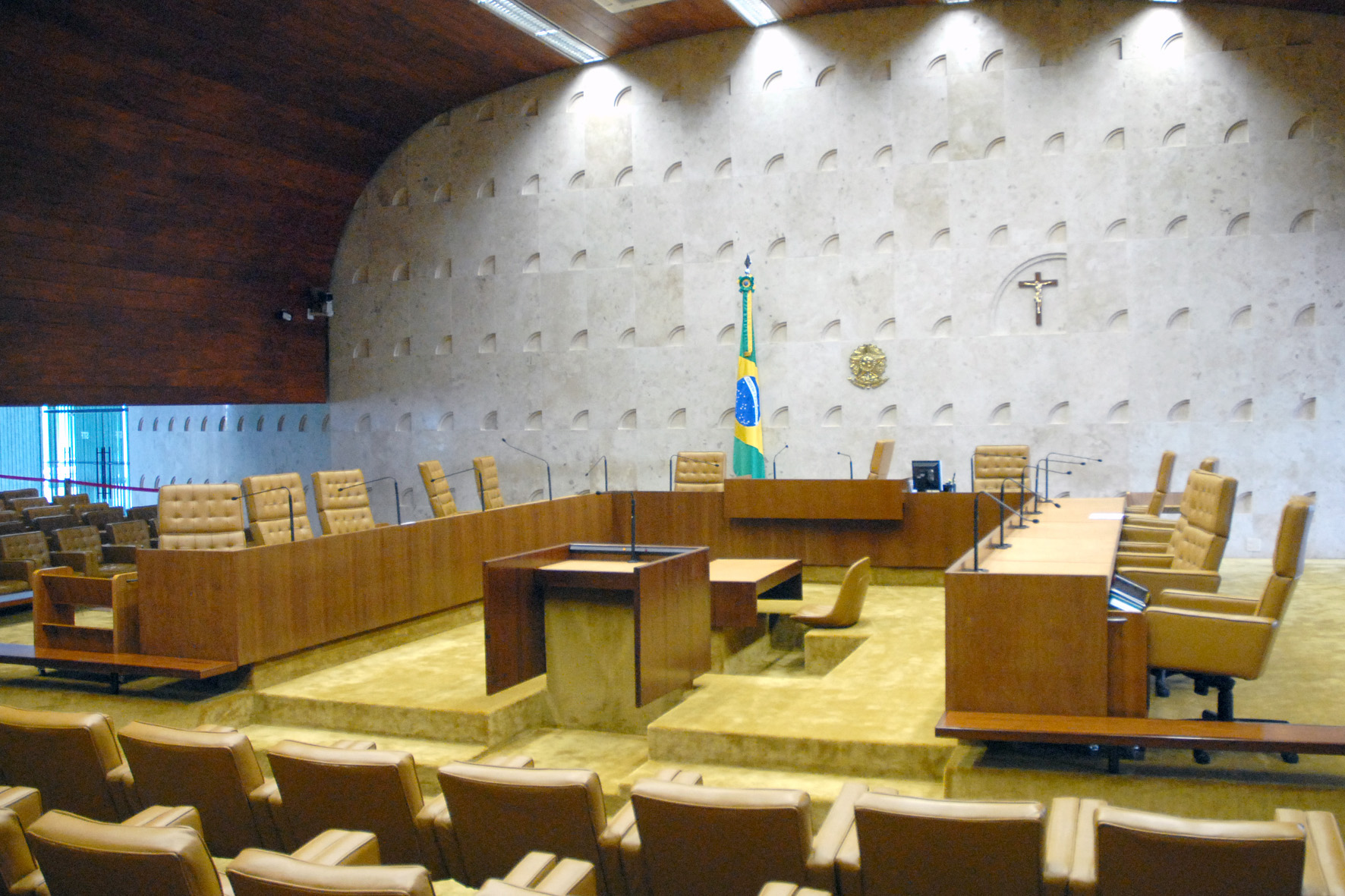
Supreme Court of Brazil

=== Judiciary representation ===
Supreme Court members	Ministers	Yes	No
Cezar Peluso	1	1	
Ayres Britto	1	1	
Cármen Lúcia	1	1	
Ellen Gracie	1	1	
Celso de Melo	1	1	
Marco Aurélio Mello	1	1	
Ricardo Lewandowski	1	1	
Luiz Fux	1	1	
Total	08	08	0

=== Legislative representation ===
Prosecutor General of the Republic	Prosecutor	Yes	No
Roberto Gurgel	1	1	
Total	1	1	0

=== Executive representation ===
Attorney General of the Union	Attorney General	Yes	No
Luís Inácio Adams	1	1	
Total	1	1	0

=== Amici curiae ===
Amici curiae (Support for ADPF 187) (02)
Associação Brasileira de Estudos Sociais de Psicoativos – ABESUP	Instituto Brasileiro de Ciências Criminais – IBCCRIM

== See also ==
- Drug liberalization
- Global Marijuana March
- Cannabis
