= Green Panthers =

Cannabis rights advocacy organization

Green Panthers logo

Green Panthers is a United States cannabis rights advocacy organization founded in Washington, D.C., in 1990 by Terry Mitchell and Loey Glover. Green Panthers headquarters moved in 1993 to Cincinnati, Ohio. The Green Panthers flag is a white field with a green cannabis leaf. The Green Panthers published a newspaper Revolutionary Times (originally Revolutionary Toker) in the 1990s.

Green Panthers organized Inhale to the Chief, a pro-marijuana rally for the inauguration of Bill Clinton, in front of the White House in Washington, D.C., in January 1993.

Green Panthers coordinated national publicity and public relations for the San Marcos Seven Hemp City demonstration in June and July, 1993.
