= Jury nullification in the United States =

Legal concept

In the United States, jury nullification occurs when a jury in a criminal case reaches a verdict contrary to the weight of evidence, sometimes because of a disagreement with the relevant law. It has its origins in colonial America under British law. The American jury draws its power of nullification from its right to render a general verdict in criminal trials, the inability of criminal courts to direct a verdict no matter how strong the evidence, the Fifth Amendment's Double Jeopardy Clause, which prohibits the appeal of an acquittal, and the fact that jurors cannot be punished for the verdict they return.

== In practice ==
The tradition of jury nullification in the United States has its roots in the British legal system, specifically in a 1670 English case where Quakers were acquitted by a jury of violating a law that permitted religious assemblies only under the Church of England. In 1735, journalist John Peter Zenger was acquitted in New York by a jury that nullified a law making it a crime to criticize public officials. Later, colonial juries nullified the Navigation Acts, which would have forced all trade with the colonies to pass through England for taxation.

Just before the American Civil War, Northern juries, increasingly abolitionist, sometimes refused to convict for violations of the 1850 Fugitive Slave Law because jurors hated the law, as it protected slaveowners. In 1851, 24 people were indicted for helping a fugitive escape from a jail in Syracuse, New York. The first four trials of the group resulted in three acquittals and one conviction, and the government dropped the remaining charges. Another case is the jury behavior after the Christiana Riot in Pennsylvania. Likewise, after a crowd broke into a Boston courtroom and rescued Anthony Burns, a slave, the grand jury indicted three of those involved, but after an acquittal and several hung juries, the government dropped the charges.

In the 1794 case Georgia v. Brailsford, the U.S. Supreme Court directed a jury that although they would ordinarily be expected to follow the judge's directions, they could not be compelled to do so. By the middle of the 19th century, some judges sought to distance themselves from this position, increasingly holding that it was for judges to decide what the law said or meant, and that it was the jurors' duty to follow these judicial interpretations. In 1895, in Sparf and Hansen v United States, the Supreme Court held that its own earlier decision had been wrong, and that a jury had a duty to apply the law as set out by the trial judge.

During the 19th and 20th centuries, especially in the 1950s and '60s civil rights movement era, some all-white juries acquitted white defendants accused of murdering blacks, but the problem, according to some scholars, was "not in jury nullification, but in jury selection. The jury was not representative of the community". During Prohibition, juries often nullified alcohol control laws, possibly as often as 60% of the time, because of disagreements with the justice of the law. This resistance is considered to have contributed to the adoption of the Twenty-first Amendment repealing the Eighteenth Amendment which established Prohibition.

Kalven's and Zeisel's study of the American jury found that juries acquitted when judges would have convicted in only 19% of cases, and of these, only 21% of the acquittals were attributable to jury nullification. Jury nullification sometimes takes the form of a jury convicting the defendant of lesser charges than the prosecutor sought.

In the 21st century, many discussions of jury nullification center around drug laws that many consider unjust either in principle or because they disproportionately affect members of certain groups. A jury nullification advocacy group estimates that 3–4% of all jury trials involve nullification, and a recent rise in hung juries (from an average of 5% to nearly 20% in some locales) is seen by some as indirect evidence that juries have begun to consider the validity or fairness of the laws themselves (though other reasons such as the CSI effect may also be involved).

During the Vietnam War era, many protestors, including Benjamin Spock, sought jury nullification. Spock was convicted of conspiracy to counsel, aid, and abet registrants to avoid the draft, after the judge instructed the jury to apply the law as he laid it down, but the United States Court of Appeals for the First Circuit overturned the conviction because the judge had committed prejudicial error in putting to the jury ten special yes-or-no questions. Eight defendants from Oakland, California, were tried in 1969 for conspiracy to disrupt a draft induction center, and the jury acquitted after being told by the judge that it could acquit if it felt the defendants' actions were protected by First Amendment guarantees of freedom of speech and assembly. Likewise, in a case involving ten Seattle protestors accused of blocking a munitions train carrying bombs destined for Vietnam, the jury acquitted after the judge allowed the defendants to talk about their motives and permitted the defense to ask the jurors to invoke their consciences and object to the war by acquitting.

The Camden 28 were acquitted despite overwhelming evidence of their guilt. In at least one case, the judge allowed the jury to hear testimony about the Pentagon Papers and the nature of the Vietnam War. In one Vietnam-era case, the defense compared the defendants' actions in breaking into a government office to the Boston Tea Party, saying that no one "would say that breaking into a ship shouldn't be criminal, shouldn't be a crime", but that it was justified under the circumstances. There was also a case in which a jury voted 9–3 to acquit peace activists despite their admission that they poured blood in a military recruiting center.

Several recent cases have prompted speculation that the verdicts were products of jury nullification. These include the prosecution of Washington, D.C.'s former mayor Marion Barry, the trial of Lorena Bobbitt, the prosecution of the police officers accused of beating Rodney King, the prosecution of two men charged with beating Reginald Denny in the resulting Rodney King riots, the trial of the Menéndez brothers for their parents' murder, and the O. J. Simpson murder case. In the days preceding Jack Kevorkian's trial for assisted suicide in Michigan, Kevorkian's lawyer, Geoffrey Fieger, told the press that he would urge the jury to disregard the law. Prosecutors prevailed upon the judge to enter a pretrial order banning any mention of nullification during the trial, but Fieger's statements had already been extensively reported in the media.

In a 1998 article, Vanderbilt University Law School Professor Nancy J. King wrote, "recent reports suggest jurors today are balking in trials in which a conviction could trigger a three strikes or other mandatory sentence, and in assisted suicide, drug possession, and firearms cases."

== Court opinions ==
In the 1794 case Georgia v. Brailsford, the Supreme Court directly tried a common law case before a jury. The facts in the case were not in dispute, and the legal opinion of the court was unanimous, but the Court was nonetheless obligated under the Seventh Amendment to refer the matter to the jury for a general verdict. Chief Justice John Jay's nuanced instructions to the jury have been cited frequently in discussions of jury nullification:

It may not be amiss, here, Gentlemen, to remind you of the good old rule, that on questions of fact, it is the province of the jury, on questions of law, it is the province of the court to decide. But it must be observed that by the same law, which recognizes this reasonable distribution of jurisdiction, you have nevertheless a right to take upon yourselves to judge of both, and to determine the law as well as the fact in controversy. On this, and on every other occasion, however, we have no doubt, you will pay that respect, which is due to the opinion of the court: For, as on the one hand, it is presumed, that juries are the best judges of facts; it is, on the other hand, presumable, that the court are the best judges of the law. But still both objects are lawfully, within your power of decision.

Although no precedent revokes the power of nullification, since the 19th century courts have tended to restrain juries from considering it, and to insist on their deference to court-given law. The first major decision in this direction was Games v. Stiles ex dem Dunn, which held that the bench could override the jury's verdict on a point of law.

The 1895 decision Sparf v. United States, written by Justice John Marshall Harlan, held that a trial judge has no responsibility to inform the jury of its right to nullify laws. It was a 5–4 decision. Often cited, it has led United States judges to commonly penalize anyone who attempts to present legal argument to jurors and to declare a mistrial if such argument has been presented to them. In some states, jurors are likely to be struck from the panel during voir dire if they will not agree to accept as correct the rulings and instructions of the law as provided by the judge.

A 1969 Fourth Circuit decision, U.S. v. Moylan, affirmed the power of jury nullification but also upheld the power of the court to refuse to permit an instruction to the jury to this effect.

We recognize, as appellants urge, the undisputed power of the jury to acquit, even if its verdict is contrary to the law as given by the judge, and contrary to the evidence. This is a power that must exist as long as we adhere to the general verdict in criminal cases, for the courts cannot search the minds of the jurors to find the basis upon which they judge. If the jury feels that the law under which the defendant is accused, is unjust, or that exigent circumstances justified the actions of the accused, or for any reason which appeals to their logic or passion, the jury has the power to acquit, and the courts must abide by that decision.

Nevertheless, in upholding the refusal to permit the jury to be so instructed, the Court held that:

…by clearly stating to the jury that they may disregard the law, telling them that they may decide according to their prejudices or consciences (for there is no check to ensure that the judgment is based upon conscience rather than prejudice), we would indeed be negating the rule of law in favor of the rule of lawlessness. This should not be allowed.

In 1972, in United States v. Dougherty, the United States Court of Appeals for the District of Columbia Circuit issued a ruling similar to Moylan that affirmed a jury's de facto power to nullify the law but upheld the denial of the defense's chance to inform the jury of that power. Then-chief judge David L. Bazelon wrote an opinion dissenting in part, arguing that the jury should be informed of its power to render a verdict according to its conscience if the law is unjust. He wrote that refusal to allow the jury to be so informed constitutes a "deliberate lack of candor". It has been argued that the denial of jury nullification requests negates much of the point of self-representation.

In 1988, in U.S. v. Krzyske, the jury asked the judge about jury nullification. The judge responded, "There is no such thing as valid jury nullification." The jury convicted the defendant. On appeal, the majority and the dissent agreed that the trial judge's instruction was untrue, but the majority held that this false representation was not a reversible error.

In 1997, in U.S. v. Thomas, the U.S. Court of Appeals for the Second Circuit ruled that jurors can be removed if there is evidence that they intend to nullify the law, under Federal Rules of Criminal Procedure 23(b). But the Second Circuit also held that the court must not remove a juror for an alleged refusal to follow the law as instructed unless the record leaves no doubt that the juror was engaged in deliberate misconduct—that he was not simply unpersuaded by the Government's case against the defendants.

We categorically reject the idea that, in a society committed to the rule of law, jury nullification is desirable or that courts may permit it to occur when it is within their authority to prevent. Accordingly, we conclude that a juror who intends to nullify the applicable law is no less subject to dismissal than is a juror who disregards the court's instructions due to an event or relationship that renders him biased or otherwise unable to render a fair and impartial verdict.

In 2001, a California Supreme Court ruling on a case involving statutory rape led to a new rule requiring jurors to inform the judge whenever a fellow juror appears to be deciding a case based on his or her dislike of a law. But the ruling cannot overturn the practice of jury nullification itself because of double jeopardy: a defendant who has been acquitted of a charge cannot be charged with it a second time, even if the court later learns jury nullification played a role in the verdict.

The Supreme Court of the United States has not recently confronted the issue directly.

Circa 1996, Laura Kriho was the sole juror holdout in a drug possession trial, one eventually declared a mistrial. Kriho was found in contempt of court and charged with perjury and obstruction of justice for learning from the Internet that the defendant could face a four- to 12-year prison term if convicted, a fact the court had not disclosed to the jury. Additionally, while not asked about her opinions about the fairness of the drug laws or her own legal history, she was prosecuted for obstruction of justice for failing to volunteer this information on her own. The trial court found "that Kriho had intended to obstruct the judicial process and that her actions had prevented the seating of a fair and impartial jury", but after four years of legal battles the charges were dropped when a district court ruled that her statements during secret jury deliberations could not be used against her. It has been argued that improved protection of the holdout juror is a necessary and critical component to the preservation of a defendant's right to a fair trial.

In 2017, the Ninth Circuit in United States v. Kleinman reviewed the jury's instruction: "You cannot substitute your sense of justice, whatever that means, for your duty to follow the law, whether you agree with it or not. It is not for you to determine whether the law is just or whether the law is unjust. That cannot be your task. There is no such thing as valid jury nullification. You would violate your oath and the law if you willfully brought a verdict contrary to the law given to you in this case." In the analysis, it determined that "it is well established that jurors have the power to nullify. Moreover, the statement that '[t]here is no such thing as valid jury nullification' could be understood as telling jurors that they do not have the power to nullify, and so it would be a useless exercise. Accordingly, we find that the last two sentences of the trial court's nullification instructions were erroneous."

In 2020, the Colorado Supreme Court ruled that handing out jury nullification brochures to prospective jurors outside a courthouse does not constitute jury tampering because the activity is not targeted at jurors for any specific case.

== Advocacy groups and proponents ==
Ron Paul, a U.S. Representative and presidential candidate in 1988, 2008 and 2012, is a supporter of jury nullification and has written extensively on the historic importance of juries as finders of fact and law.

Some advocacy groups and websites argue that private parties in cases where the government is the opponent have the right to have juries be instructed that they have the right and duty to render a verdict contrary to legal positions they believe to be unjust or unconstitutional. These and other organizations contact citizens directly and lobby for legal reforms regarding instructions given to jurors.

Jury scholar and attorney Clay Conrad argues that there is nothing wrong with jury nullification: it is part and parcel of what a jury is all about. Conrad extensively reviews cases of jury nullification in cases of racist juries acquitting in cases of pro-segregation violence. The racist communities that produced the racist juries had also elected racist police, prosecutors, and judges. Such cases were rarely prosecuted at all, and when they were, due to outside political pressure, only the minimum effort to go through the motions of a trial was made, with jury selection systems crafted by political leaders to exclude non-whites. Reviewing Conrad's book, University of Tennessee law professor Glenn Reynolds wrote that jury nullification is parallel with the doctrine of prosecutorial discretion.

The late Chief Justice of the Washington State Supreme Court William C. Goodloe was an advocate of jury nullification and suggested that the following instruction be given by judges to all juries in criminal cases:

You are instructed that this being a criminal case you are the exclusive judges of the evidence, the credibility of the witnesses and the weight to be given to their testimony, and you have a right also to determine the law in the case. The court does not intend to express any opinion concerning the weight of the evidence, but it is the duty of the court to advise you as to the law, and it is your duty to consider the instructions of the court; yet in your decision upon the merits of the case you have a right to determine for yourselves the law as well as the facts by which your verdict shall be governed.

The United States Libertarian Party's platform states, "We assert the common-law right of juries to judge not only the facts but also the justice of the law."

== Criminal prosecutions ==
=== Julian P. Heicklen – Teaneck, New Jersey – Fall 2010 ===
In the fall of 2010 Julian P. Heicklen of Teaneck, New Jersey, a jury nullification activist who had made a regular practice of handing out information about jury nullification outside courthouses, was charged in federal court in Manhattan with jury tampering, a misdemeanor. He has previously been cited several times for distributing fliers without a permit outside the Federal Courthouse in Manhattan. Heicklen, a retired chemistry professor, was arraigned February 25, 2011 before a magistrate judge. The maximum penalty is 6 months' incarceration. Because Heicklen was charged with a misdemeanor, he was not entitled to a jury trial. The statute under which Heicklen was charged, Title 18 USC Section 1504, reads in pertinent part:

Whoever attempts to influence the action or decision of any grand or petit juror of any court of the United States upon any issue or matter pending before such juror, or before the jury of which he is a member, or pertaining to his duties, by writing or sending to him any written communication, in relation to such issue or matter, shall be fined under this title or imprisoned not more than six months, or both.

A federal judge dismissed the case against Heicklen on April 19, 2012.

=== Keith Wood – Mecosta County, Michigan – November 24, 2015 ===
On November 24, 2015, Keith Wood was arrested and charged with felony obstruction of justice and misdemeanor jury tampering after he handed out fliers, stating that jurors have the right to practice jury nullification, on the sidewalk in front of the Mecosta County, Michigan, courthouse. The felony charge was dismissed. He was convicted on the misdemeanor jury tampering charge in a jury trial in which Mecosta County Circuit Judge Kimberly Booher ruled against arguing a first amendment defense.

On July 28, 2020, the Michigan Supreme Court overturned Wood's conviction.

== Opponents ==
James Wilson, founding father and one of the leading legal theorists of the day, was one of the only sources from the era that addressed jury nullification. He defended the jury's right to render a general verdict (to determine the law as well as the fact). However, in rendering that verdict, he asserted that juries must "determine those questions, as judges must determine them, according to law." He noted that the law was "governed by precedents, and customs, and authorities, and maxims," that are "alike obligatory upon jurors as upon judges, in deciding questions of law." In essence, Wilson was arguing that juries must not disregard the law because laws are the result of due process by legal representatives of the people.

One opponent of jury nullification was former judge and unsuccessful Supreme Court nominee Robert Bork. In an essay, he wrote that jury nullification is a "pernicious practice".

Some have argued that it is not sufficient to instruct jurors that they may judge the law if legal arguments are not made to them, that such incomplete information may indeed do more harm than good, and that we must return to the standard of due process represented by the Stettinius and Fenwick cases. Some alleged costs of jury nullification include inconsistent verdicts and discouraging of guilty pleas.

There is some question as to whether jury nullification should be disallowed in cases where there is an identifiable crime victim. Jury nullification has more support among legal academics than judges.

Jury nullification has also been criticized for having resulted in the acquittal of whites who victimized blacks in the Deep South. David L. Bazelon argued, "One often-cited abuse of the nullification power is the acquittal by bigoted juries of whites who commit crimes (lynching, for example) against blacks. That repellent practice cannot be directly arrested without jeopardizing important constitutional protections-the double jeopardy bar and the jury's power of nullification. But the revulsion and sense of shame fostered by that practice fueled the civil rights movement, which in turn made possible the enactment of major civil rights legislation. That same movement spurred on the revitalization of the equal protection clause and, in particular, the recognition of the right to be tried before a jury selected without bias. The lessons we learned from these abuses helped to create a climate in which such abuses could not so easily thrive." However, Julian Heicklen disputed this: "The problem with the all-white juries that refused to convict whites that committed crimes against blacks was not in jury nullification, but in jury selection. The jury was not representative of the community and would not provide a fair and impartial trial."

Leipold points out that to argue that nullification prevents unfair prosecutions is to argue that it is unfair to convict a defendant when a representative legislature has passed a statute making a certain behavior a crime, the evidence shows beyond a reasonable doubt that the defendant engaged in that behavior, and the accused has no defense to the charge.

== See also ==
- Jury Nullification (book)
