= Sisters of the Valley =

American business

- Location: Merced, California
- Opening date: 2015
- Owner: Christine Meeusen
- Number of tenants: 3
- Website: https://sistersofcbd.com/

Sisters of the Valley is a small business that sells cannabidiol tinctures, cannabidiol infused oil, and cannabidiol salves, for oral and topical use, made with ethanol and coconut oil, via their website and the craft e-commerce website Etsy. It is based in Merced, California, and its proprietors follow a monastic motif.

== History ==
In 2015, the year Sisters of the Valley was founded, the Sisters generated $60,000 in profit. Early on the business, the company was banned from advertising on Facebook, and started focusing its communications effort on PR.

At its pre-COVID-19 peak, Sisters of the Valley generated $1.2 million in revenue. By 2024, revenues dropped to $350,000. Members of the Sisters were featured as nuns from the fictional "Sisters of the Brave Beaver" in Paul Thomas Anderson's 2025 film One Battle After Another.

== Description ==
Following practices of biodynamic agriculture, workers regulate their operations by the cycles of the moon, starting two-week production intervals upon the new moon, during which time they also practice chastity and vegetarianism.

The owner and "lead Sister" Christine Meeusen, who does not identify with Christianity, considers the production to be a spiritual activity, whose rituals and incorporate New Age practices and environmentalism, borrowing from "Native American" practices. Meeusen also mentions the Beguines to refer to her business' philosophy.

The members wear religious habits and refer to each other as sisters, but claim no affiliation with a religious order. They claim inspiration from the medieval Beguines.

Business Insider calls the Sisters of the Valley nuns "the most talked-about women in the pot business".
