= Fernanda de la Figuera =

Fernanda de la Figuera (Madrid, October 20, 1943 – Zaragoza, April 24, 2022) was an activist for the legalization of cannabis in Spain. In the Spanish pro-cannabis social movements, she received the affectionate nickname of "Abuela Marijuana" (the "Marijuana Grandma"), and was considered one of the most veteran and recognized anti-prohibitionist activists in Europe.

In 1995, de la Figuera was the first "legal" cannabis grower in Spain thanks to a ruling in her favor by a judge allowing her to self-consume cannabis.

Established in Malaga for most of her life, she co-founded several organization and was involved with several of Spain's cannabis political parties.
