= Vicente LLP =

American cannabis law firm

- Headquarters: Denver, Colorado
- No. of offices: 9
- No. of attorneys: about 40 as of 2019
- No. of employees: about 100 as of 2019
- Major practice areas: Cannabis law, marijuana law, psychedelic law, corporate law, government policy
- Date founded: May 2010
- Founder: Brian Vicente; Christian Sederberg; Joshua Kappel
- Company type: Professional Association
- Website: https://vicentellp.com/

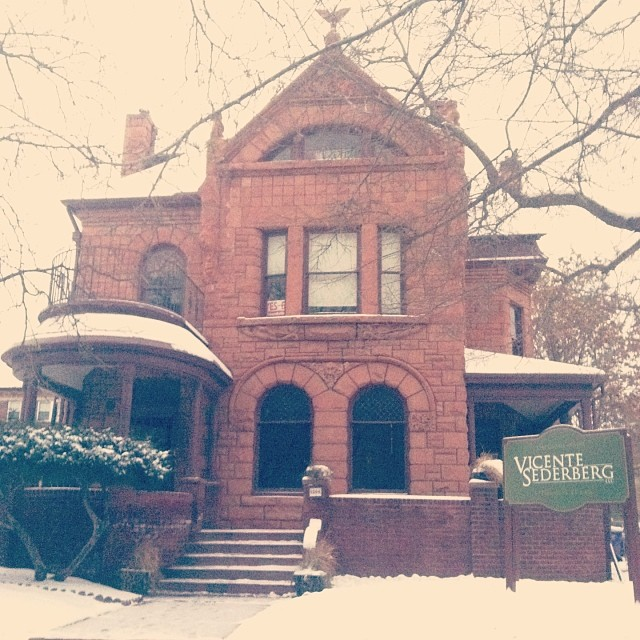
Vicente Sederberg's second office at the Creswell Mansion

Vicente LLP, formally known as Vicente Sederberg, is an American cannabis law firm headquartered in Denver, Colorado that represents clients in the cannabis (marijuana, hemp, CBD) and psychedelics industries, and works on state and local cannabis policy reform. Since 2019, the firm has been nationally recognized by Chambers and Partners as one of seven Band 1 Law firms in the US practicing cannabis law.

== History ==
Founded in 2010 by Brian Vicente, Christian Sederberg, and Joshua Kappel - from its offset, Vicente practices in areas directly related to cannabis and psychedelics. The firm's former Denver office, the Creswell Mansion, was built in 1889 by Denver architect John J. Huddart and added to the National Register of Historic Places in 1977. After six years at "The Mansion", Vicente's Denver location moved to their current office located at 1553 Platte Street, Denver, Colorado 80202 in August 2024.

== Advocacy ==
Vicente played a key role in passing Colorado Amendment 64, a ballot initiative to legalize, regulate, and tax the sale of marijuana to adults 21 or older. Founding partner Brian Vicente was a co-author of Amendment 64 and the law firm's office served as the campaign headquarters.

The firm also has played a significant role in advising national, state and local government officials in the development of regulated cannabis markets across the country and around the world, including Uruguay, the first country in the world to legalize and regulate marijuana for adult use.

Firm founding partner Christian Sederberg is a Colorado lobbyist who worked on former Colorado Governor John Hickenlooper's Amendment 64 Implementation Task force and the Committee for Responsible Regulation, and other committees and associations.

Founding partner Joshua Kappel co-authored Colorado's Proposition 122, the Natural Medicine Health Act of 2022, and served as chair of the campaign committee for Natural Medicine Colorado. Proposition 122 was passed by Colorado voters in November 2022. He is actively involved in the development and implementation of the NMHA (including Colorado's SB23-290) and other psychedelics laws and policies in the U.S. and abroad. In addition, Joshua is a founding board member of the Microdosing Collective—the only recognized nonprofit in the U.S. dedicated to legalizing microdosing.

Vicente's Hemp and Cannabinoids Practice Chair, partner Shawn Hauser, is a steering committee member of the American Hemp Campaign, and was the lead author of the 2018 Farm Bill Policy Guide and Model Hemp Production Plan]. She has testified before the U.S. Food & Drug Administration on behalf of the hemp industry.

Vicente was the law firm that provided counsel for the Hemp Industries Association (HIA) in its case against the Drug Enforcement Administration (DEA) in October 2020, where the HIA and a hemp product manufacturer filed a lawsuit against the DEA to challenge the agency's "interim final rule" on hemp production. The lawsuit argued that the DEA's rule improperly classified certain hemp extracts as Schedule I controlled substances, even if the final product contained a legal level of THC. The court ultimately sided with the DEA, though the DEA has not actively enforced the rule.

== In the media ==
In April 2014, 5280 magazine listed Vicente and Sederberg as among the most powerful people in Denver.

In November 2022, U.S. News & World Report ranked Vicente Sederberg LLP in the 'Best Law Firms' for Corporate Law, Land Use & Zoning Law lists.

In June 2023, Chambers and Partners USA listed Vicente LLP as a Band 1 law firm in Cannabis Law for the fifth year in a row.

In July 2026, The Denver Post included Brian Vicente in its list of the "150 most notable Coloradans" published in recognition of Colorado's 150th anniversary

In September 2026, partner Charlie Alovisetti was quoted by WWBT about the Virginia Cannabis Control Authority's first draft of adult-use retail regulations. Alovisetti said the firm represented businesses that were seeking Virginia licenses, and he identified financing and real estate as the primary challenges for applicants.
