= Christine Meeusen =

Cannabis entrepreneur in California

- Born: c. 1959
- Other names: Sister Kate
- Occupations: Owner, Sisters of the Valley

Christine Meeusen (b. 1959 or 1960 (age 65–66)), also known as "Sister Kate", is a Merced-based farmer and businessperson, best known as the founder and owner of Sisters of the Valley, a business specializing in high-CBD, low-THC preparations made from on-premises grown cannabis.

== Biography ==
Christine Meeusen was born into a Catholic family in Milwaukee, Wisconsin. She married, had three children, and settled in Amsterdam, where she worked as a consultant. After she and her husband divorced, she experienced serious financial difficulties and returned to the United States with her children in 2009. Upon arriving in California in 2010, she founded "Caregrowers", a medical cannabis company, with her brother. Also in 2010, Meeusen became involved in the Occupy Movement, donning a Halloween costume nun's habit and becoming known as "Sister Occupy". In 2013 and 2014, Caregrowers closed and she began to adopt the nun persona full-time for her new company, Sisters of the Valley. As of 2025, she continues to use the Sister Kate moniker and dress in the production of cannabis medicine.

She produces the medicine in a semi-cooperative operation in Merced, California, Sisters of the Valley, with her partner Darcy "Sister Darcy" Johnson and other temporary workers. Meeusen, who does not identify with Christianity, considers the production to be a spiritual activity, whose rituals and incorporate New Age practices and environmentalism, "borrowing" from Native American practices.
