= Safia Lebdi =

French politician and activist

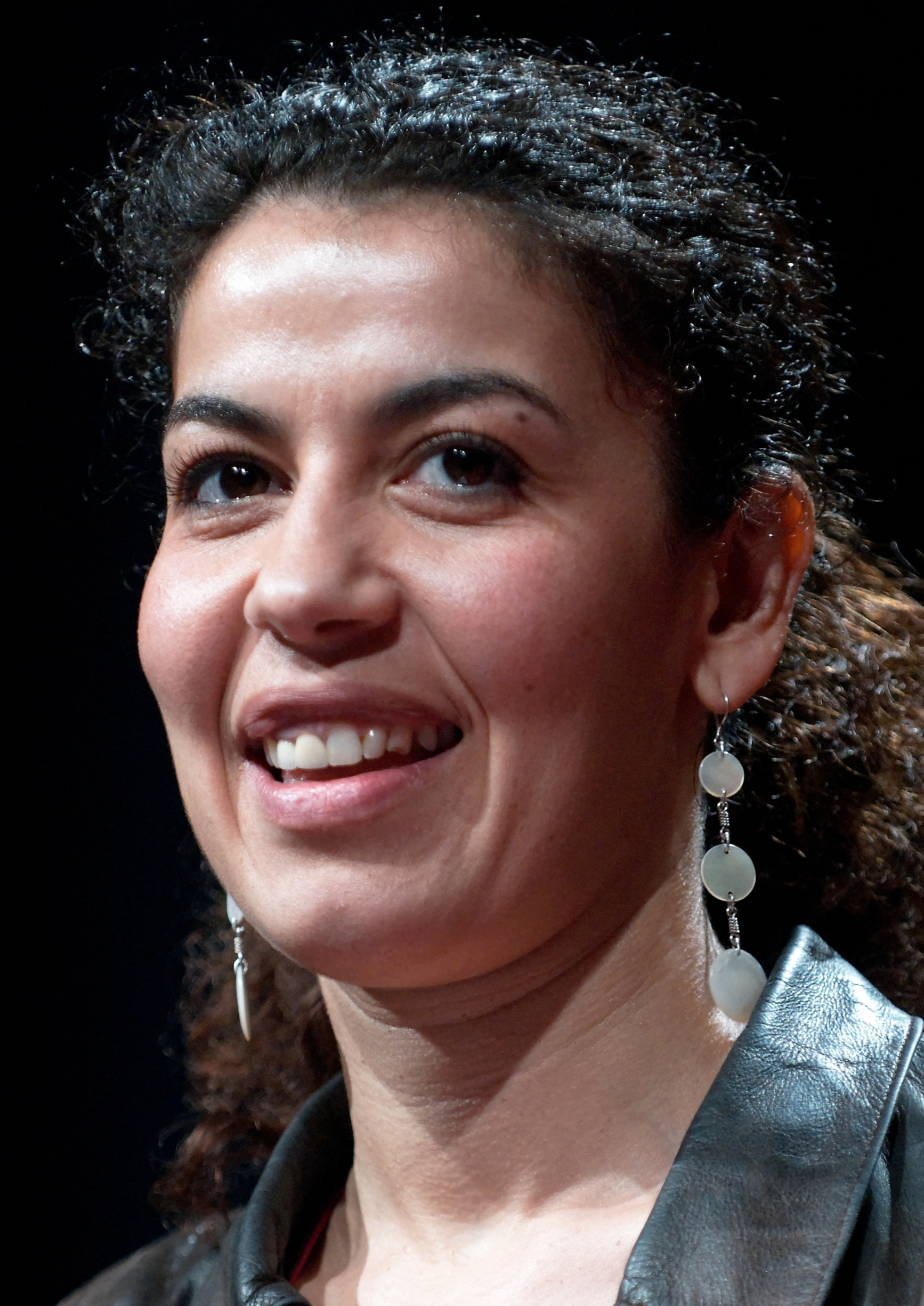
- Safia Lebdi in 2009
- Born: Safia Lebdi; 6 February 1974 (age 51); Clermont-Ferrand, France
- Occupation(s): Political, activist

Safia Lebdi (born on February 6, 1974, in Clermont-Ferrand) is a French politician and activist.

Advocating feminism and secularism, and a member of Europe Écologie Les Verts, in 2007 she created the Insoumis-es movement, of which she is president. She is also president of Legalize, a pro-cannabis association.

== Biography ==
Safia Lebdi has been involved with women in her neighborhood since 1998, leading meetings and subsequently a national march in 23 cities in France, "the women's march against the ghettos and for equality", which will give birth to the Ni Putes Ni Soumises movement. Co-founder and spokesperson, she refuses political appropriation and created Les Insoumis-es. In 2010, she was elected EELV regional councilor for Île-de-France; in this capacity, she chaired the Île-de-France film commission for six years and was also a member of the culture commission.

In 2011, she initiated Michel Gondry's amateur film factory in Aubervilliers. A disused match factory, the Manufacture des allumettes d'Aubervilliers, has been transformed into a place of image education for young people. Safia Lebdi supports many creations from the suburbs, including Houda Benyamina, who won the Caméra d'or at the Cannes Film Festival in May 2016 for her first feature film Divines, or the recycling of cultural sets with Arstock and La Réserve des arts.

In 2012, Safia Lebdi organized the visit to Paris of Femen from Ukraine, establishing the movement internationally. Eminent Femen will thus appear in the Arab world, advocating for LGBT rights, particularly in Tunisia and Morocco.
