= Steve McWilliams =

American drug activist

Steve McWilliams was a medical marijuana activist from San Diego, California who protested the treatment of people under anti-cannabis laws. He committed suicide in 2005.

== Biography ==
Steven McWilliams was a "former cowboy" who attended Western State Colorado University and the University of Colorado. In 1992, McWilliams was in a motorcycle accident and sustained a head injury, and afterwards suffered from chronic pain and migraines, which he said he found relief from with medical marijuana.

== Medical marijuana activism ==
After California passed Proposition 215 in 1996, which allowed certain patients to be recommended cannabis by a doctor, McWilliams opened multiple medical marijuana collectives in San Diego to provide cannabis for patients, including Shelter from the Storm and Valley Center Cannabis Club.

In January 1998, Valley Center Cannabis Club was raided and McWilliams was arrested for possession. That March he was arraigned for growing, selling, and transporting cannabis, which led to the first widely publicized case about the enforcement and limits of Proposition 215. The District Attorney declined to press charges due to lack of information.

In 2002, McWilliams protested obstruction of Proposition 215 by standing in front of San Diego City Hall by smoking and handing out cannabis to patients. He also showed up weekly to Town Council meetings, sometimes carrying a live marijuana plant, to convince the local government to make clear local regulations regarding medical marijuana in San Diego.

McWilliams was arrested in 2002 by federal law enforcement for growing about two dozen cannabis plants at his home in Normal Heights. In early 2003, United States District Judge James Fitzgerald sentenced him to six months in federal prison. He was not allowed to use cannabis as part of his bail terms. There was speculation McWilliams was targeted with a harsh sentence due to his activism. Not long after, the Supreme Court ruled that federal cannabis laws superseded local laws, which meant McWilliams' appeal would be denied and he would go to prison. On July 12, 2005 on his 51st birthday, McWilliams committed suicide by overdosing on methadone, an opioid he had been prescribed for pain. In his suicide note, he said that he was in pain and hoped his death might convince the government to respect people's right to cannabis. He also called out Reuben Brooks, the federal judge who had ruled he could not use medical marijuana while out on bail.

After his death, more than a dozen cities in the United States held memorial services in his honor.
