= Jessica Peck =

American public policy activist (born 1979)

- Born: 1979 (age 46–47); Alexandria, Virginia, U.S.
- Occupation: Attorney
- Known for: Public policy analyst, commentator

Jessica Peck (formerly Corry) (born 1979) is an American attorney, columnist, public policy analyst, and comic. As a conservative Republican, she is best known as the Republican director of the Open Government Institute, a bi-partisan, non-profit election transparency organization. She frequently appears on national cable television shows, and has been featured in a Newsweek cover story and a Washington Post column as a leading voice transforming the partisan nature of America's drug policy debate. Specifically, she has articulated her support of the decriminalization of marijuana. High Times magazine featured Peck as a 2009 "freedom fighter of the month".

== Education ==
Peck has a bachelor's degree in journalism from University of Colorado Boulder (2001), a master's degree in government from Johns Hopkins University (2003), and a J.D. degree from the University of Denver. In addition, she has held several prestigious fellowships, including the Pulliam Fellowship, the Washington Center For Politics and Journalism Fellowship, and the Phillips Foundation's Robert Novak Journalism Fellowship. She has studied at multiple international educational institutions, including Georgetown University in Washington, D.C., Prague's Charles University and the University of the Dutch Antilles in Curaçao.

== Career ==
She represents clients across the nation, most frequently in Washington, D.C. A former U.S. Senate press secretary, she has also worked as a print and broadcast journalist, a broadcast producer, and as a sideline freelancer for ESPN's Monday Night Football.

In 2008, Peck served as executive director of the "Yes on 46" campaign, which unsuccessfully sought passage of Colorado ballot initiative Amendment 46, a campaign determined to end race and gender affirmative action programs in state government and public contracting. Today, she serves as an appointee to the U.S. Civil Rights Commission's Colorado Advisory Committee, through which she chairs the sub-committee on educational due process. As the youngest of four children raised by a single father and as part of a broader multi-ethnicity family, Peck vocally rejected what she refers to as "the soft bigotry of low expectations" for demographic groups presumed as inferior and in need of government aid simply because of biology. Similarly, in 2004 she opposed restrictions imposed on an education class at the University of Colorado Boulder seeking enrollment of minorities and first-generation college students, which resulted in the university rescinding the restrictions.

The Amendment 46 contest was the most narrow election outcome in that year's Colorado general election, garnering 49 percent of the vote. In 2004, and at the minimum permissible age of 25, Peck ran for the District 19 seat in the Colorado State Senate but was defeated by incumbent Sue Windels. Peck's defeats here have been followed by many legislative and litigation victories related to property rights, medical marijuana, free speech, and parental rights. She is known as a free thinking libertarian who has frequently taken on the GOP over its more conservative positions relating to gay rights and sentencing reform.

== Personal life ==
She is the mother to two young children and lives in Denver's Hilltop neighborhood. Peck was formerly married to Denver lawyer Rob Corry. After the fallout following an incident where Corry was accused of and eventually convicted of third degree sexual assault on a family friend, the two divorced.
