= Rachel K. Gillette =

American attorney

Rachel K. Gillette is an American attorney who specializes in law relating to marijuana and the cannabis industry. Gillette is based in Lafayette, Colorado. As a lawyer, she is licensed to practice law in Colorado and Connecticut.

== Biography ==
Gillette earned her Juris Doctor from Quinnipiac University. Starting in 2010, she began to practice law related to the cannabis industry. That year, she opened her own law business in Colorado after House Bill 1284 was passed. In 2016, she became the head of the Denver office of the law firm, Greenspoon Marder. Gillette currently serves as the head of the firm's national cannabis law practice, and is expected to help grow that sector for the firm.

In 2013, Gillette was the executive director of the National Organization for the Reform of Marijuana Laws (NORML) in Colorado. She advocates drug-testing reform that would protect workers using cannabis while off-duty. Gillette sued the IRS for a client who is in the cannabis industry who was penalized for paying taxes in cash, a common practice in the industry. Gillette also worked on legal issues for the development of PotCoin. Gillette is an outspoken critic of the "war on drugs", and considers state legalization of marijuana as an "exit strategy for the failed drug war," according to the BBC.
