= Cannabis in Ontario =

Seal designating an authorized recreational cannabis retailer in Ontario

Map of age of legal cannabis use per province Minimum age is 21 Minimum age is 19 Minimum age is 18

Cannabis in Ontario is legal for both medical and recreational purposes. Cannabis in Canada has been legal for medicinal purposes since 2001 under conditions outlined in the Access to Cannabis for Medical Purposes Regulations, issued by Health Canada, while seed, grain, and fibre production are permitted under licence. The federal Cannabis Act, legalizing cannabis for recreational use, came into effect on 17 October 2018.

The Cannabis Act tasks each province and territory to set its own laws for various aspects regarding recreational use cannabis, such as the legal age, whether householders can grow cannabis and the method of retail sales. The latter aspect varies as to ownership of retail outlets (by the provincial government or private enterprise) but all provinces and territories include an option for on-line sales.

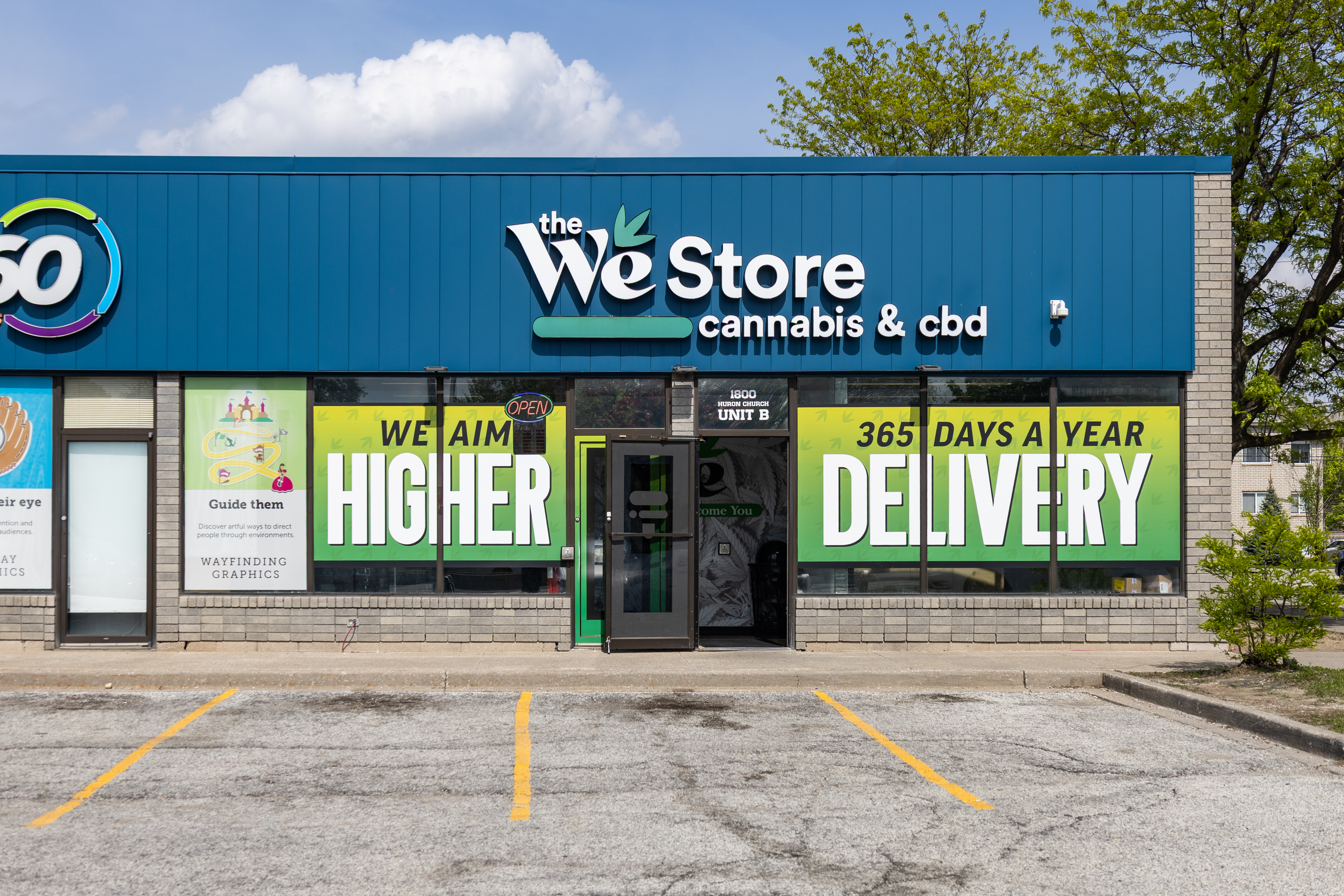
A cannabis dispensary pictured in Windsor

In 2019, the Government of Ontario initially issued 25 retail licenses for brick-and-mortar stores to sell recreational cannabis; the selection was based on strict criteria and a lottery system. An additional 50 licenses were subsequently issued. By April 2020, the government planned to eliminate the lottery system and to begin issuing roughly 20 new permits per month to increase availability as part of the plan to combat sales by black market dealers. Retail on-line sales of recreational cannabis remained in the hands of the Ontario Cannabis Store, operated by the provincial government.

== Legalization for recreational use ==
The Ontario Cannabis Retail Corporation is the sole legal wholesale distributor and online retailer of recreational cannabis in Ontario. The online store operates under the Ontario Cannabis Store (OCS) branding. The initial plan for legalization was for all retail outlets in Ontario to be operated by OCS, with at least 150 OCS stores opened by 2020.

Following the election of the Progressive Conservative Party to government in the 2018 Ontario general election, the provincial government announced significant changes to the cannabis regulation and distribution system in August 2018. Plans for brick-and-mortar OCS retail outlets were cancelled, with OCS now intended to only operate as an online retailer with deliveries made by Canada Post. In addition to acting as the sole online retailer of recreational cannabis in Ontario, OCS will also act as the wholesale provider for private retail stores. Municipal governments were given the opportunity for indefinite opt-outs from having retail stores opened in their municipalities provided that they passed a council resolution in favour of opting out and they informed the Alcohol and Gaming Commission of Ontario in writing before 22 January 2019.

In early November, Canada Post advised the OCS that the names and addresses of 4,500 customers had been accessed by an individual without authority to do so.

This shows the large, regulated THC logo that must be present on all THC containing products sold in Ontario

Ontario Cannabis Duty Paid sticker, with Ontario's yellow colouring

Ontario bans the sale of recreational marijuana to anyone under the age of 19 (the same age that one can legally purchase alcohol or tobacco) and adults can carry up to 30 grams in public. Minors between the ages of 12 and 18 who possess less than five grams of cannabis can be given a provincial offences ticket of $200. If they are caught with more than five grams they will face further disciplinary action by being charged under the Youth Criminal Justice Act. However, in order to avoid the consequence of a permanent criminal record youth can be referred to complete the online Youth Cannabis Diversion program.

Cannabis edibles are sold in the province in various forms, including baked goods, candies, and beverages. Ontario's cannabis legislation allows for vaping and smoking of the product in public wherever tobacco may be smoked, and is subject to the same restrictions as tobacco. For home cultivation, up to four plants may be grown per household.

== Usage ==
In 2013, 12.1 percent of residents reported that they consumed cannabis in the past twelve months, the third highest in the country. In 2017, Statistics Canada reported that the province had the fourth highest per capita usage in the country of 21 grams per person.

In late November 2019, Statista released an update. On a Canada-wide basis, some 29.8 percent of adults between 25 and 34 had consumed cannabis in the previous 90 days. Usage among adults age 65 and over was only 7.6 percent. Specifics for Ontario were not available.

== Black market competition ==
Increasing the supply by increasing the number of retail outlets selling recreational cannabis in 2020 was expected to help "combat the illicit market" according to the Attorney General.

For the duration of 2016–2018, the city of Hamilton was nicknamed "Hamsterdam" due to the association with Amsterdam and the cannabis market. Hamilton had a record 83 black market dispensaries at its peak.

The black market remained persistent, according to an October 2019 report, partly because of a lack of retail outlets in many communities and because of lower prices charged by dealers operating illegally. On a Canada-wide basis, the illegal product was roughly 35% less expensive, according to StatsCan. An independent cannabis research firm estimated that Canada-wide, the black market accounted for 86% of cannabis sales. Specifics for Ontario were not provided.

As of 17 December 2021, the quarterly report of the OCS reported that 55% of all cannabis transactions took place within the legal market.

== Industrial hemp ==
Industrial hemp is the cannabis plant and variances that contain under 0.3% THC in the leaves and flowering heads. Under the Opium Narcotic Drug Act, hemp production was prohibited in Canada in 1938 for the battle against THC abuse, now under the Controlled Drugs and Substance Act (CDSA) and subsection Industrial Hemp Regulation (IHR) permission of Canadian Farmer's under regulated approval the right to commercially produce industrial hemp on 12 March 1998.

There are two separate licensing applications for individuals and corporations that gives the right to grow, sell, import/export, sterilize, clean and prepare industrial hemp. As of November 2017, there were 83 total licenses and registries in Ontario and a total of 1830 in Canada which gave rights to 22 approved cultivars in 2017 that had 55,853.97 hectares (138,018.2 acres) for cultivation of industrial hemp, 474.46 hectares (1,172.4 acres) of which was in Ontario. Ontario Ministry of Agriculture, Food and Rural Affairs gives background information on industrial hemp and a fact sheet on growing industrial hemp from start to finish, idea soil conditions all the way to the economics of hemp production. Uses of industrial hemp include construction materials, textiles, paper, rope and twine, various food products, cosmetics, and fuel.
