= Brian Vicente =

American activist

Brian Vicente is an American attorney and marijuana rights advocate. He is a partner and founding member of Vicente LLP, which Rolling Stone has labeled "the country's first powerhouse marijuana law firm." Vicente was one of the primary authors of Colorado Amendment 64 and was co-director of the successful 'Yes on 64' campaign in 2012, which resulted in Colorado (along with Washington on the same day) becoming the first state in the world to make the possession, use, and regulated distribution of marijuana legal for adults.

Vicente served as chair of the Committee for Responsible Regulation and was a member of the Colorado Department of Revenue Medical Marijuana Workgroup. In 2018, Colorado Governor Jared Polis selected Vicente to serve as a member of his gubernatorial transition team, where he sat on the Economic Development and Labor Committee.

In 2023, Vicente was elected as a board member of the Marijuana Policy Project. He is also a member of the DanceSafe Advisory Council. In 2010, Vicente was elected as the first board chair of the National Cannabis Industry Association. Vicente has also served as executive director of Sensible Colorado and on the boards of the Harm Reduction Action Center, the SAFER Voter Education Fund, and the City of Denver's Marijuana Policy Review Panel.Vicente is the co-founder and president of the National Hispanic Cannabis Council.

Vicente has conducted over one thousand interviews regarding marijuana policy, for national, state, and local media outlets; The Guardian called him "the (cannabis) industry's de facto spokesman".

Vicente is happily married to Jessica Chapman, and has 2 children; Nina and Luke, along with their beloved dog.
