= San Marcos Seven =

Texas cannabis rights demonstrators

Four demonstrators of the San Marcos Seven: Joe Gaddy, Jeffrey Stefanoff, Joe Ptak, and Bill O’Rourke

The San Marcos Seven (or San Marcos 7) were seven demonstrators—Angela Atkins, Jody Dodd, Daniel Rodrigues Scales, Bill O’Rourke, Joe Gaddy, Jeffrey Stefanoff, and Joe Ptak—convicted of misdemeanor possession of cannabis following protests at the San Marcos, Texas, police station in March, 1991.

Three of the protesters (Gaddy, Stefanoff, and Ptak) pleaded not guilty and were convicted by juries; two received prison sentences and one received probation. The four who pleaded guilty were given deferred adjudication and were sentenced to do community service work.

While incarcerated, Gaddy and Stefanoff went on hunger strikes. A protest camp supporting the San Marcos Seven grew outside the Hays County Law Enforcement Center in June, 1993, while Stefanoff was incarcerated.

== Background ==
Jeffrey Sefanoff, a Vietnam War Army veteran, and musician and painter Joe Ptak, before conspiring to get arrested for cannabis at the police station, published the Hays County Guardian, a free newspaper that focused on social justice issues. Stefanoff and Ptak sued Texas State University when the school tried to bar them from distributing the paper and won at the appeals court level, and the Supreme Court refused to hear the university's appeal.

Brett Stahl, a San Marcos businessman, was arrested in 1992 for marijuana possession when he went to the Texas Comptroller of Public Accounts office to buy tax stamps for the cannabis.

During the same week in 1991 as the San Marcos Seven protests, a drug policy forum sponsored by the Associated Student Government was held at Texas State University. Joe Gaddy was arrested on the day before the forum began.

== Civil disobedience ==
Over nine days beginning March 12, 1991, nine people came to the sheriff's office in Hays County, Texas, to smoke a joint in acts of civil disobedience protesting laws against marijuana. The seven who were arrested for smoking marijuana in the parking lot, Gaddy, Stefanoff, Angela Atkins, Ptak, Jody Dodd, Daniel Rodriguez Scales, and Bill O’Rourke, were charged with Class B misdemeanors, punishable in Texas by up to six months in jail and a $1,000 fine. Four of the protesters agreed to plea bargains and were ordered to do community service work and three went to trial.

The civil disobedience was cooperative between protesters and police.

Two of the nine protesters were not arrested for marijuana possession. One of them did not bring enough marijuana to be arrested. And one of them was on parole and was talked out of getting arrested by a sheriff's deputy.

The seven who were arrested were employed as house painters, construction workers, graduate students, cooks, and chimney sweeps. They became known as the “San Marcos Seven.”

== Trials ==
Gaddy, who was 29 at the time of his arrest, was the first to stand trial for marijuana possession. Howard Warner was the judge. Activists wearing pro-hemp shirts packed the courtroom. He was convicted, served a four-month prison sentence, and was fined $700. Gaddy said of the near-maximum sentence, that he felt he was being made an example, and that he felt the only way to highlight the need to change the law was by breaking it. The Fort Worth Star-Telegram speculated that Gaddy's sentence may have been influenced by the fact that his trial took place during national Red Ribbon Week, which honors Enrique Camarena, a Drug Enforcement Administration undercover agent who was tortured and murdered.

Stefanoff, 38 at the time of arrest, was the second to stand trial. The judge was Warner. The jury deliberated for just 20 minutes. Stefanoff was sentenced to six months in jail.

Ptak, 33, was the last to stand trial. He was sentenced to probation, and paid a fine.

== Responses to trial outcomes ==
=== Hunger strikes ===
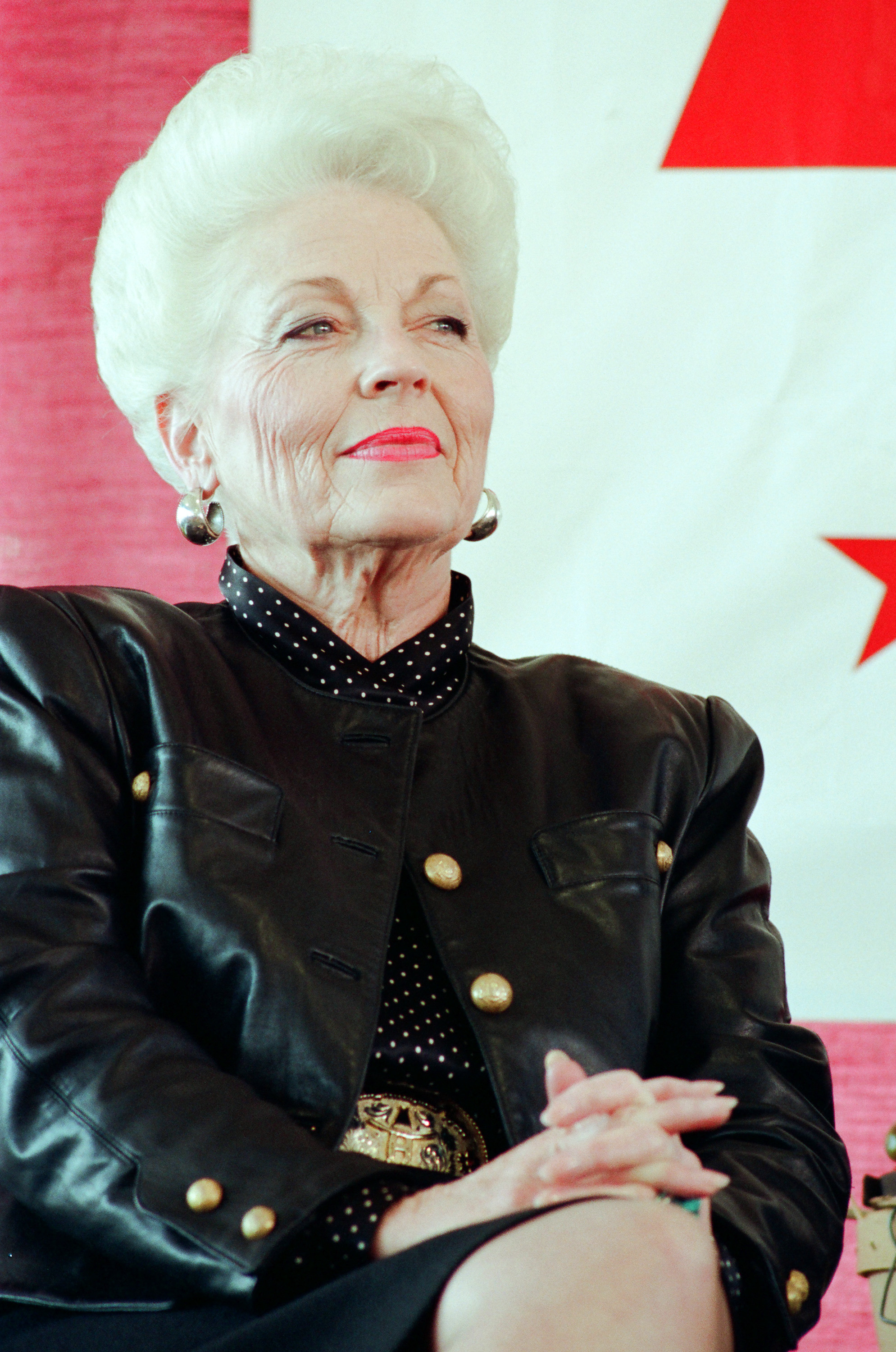
Gaddy wrote a letter to Ann Richards (pictured in 1992) asking for a pardon.

Gaddy started a hunger strike when his sentence began on November 14, 1991. He was put under medical supervision, and wrote a letter to Governor Ann Richards asking for a pardon. On November 22, about 30 supporters demonstrated outside the jail, chanting “Let Joe go.” He ended his hunger strike after 18 days, on December 2, when Sheriff Paul Hastings carried out a court order to feed Gaddy intravenously and had a needle inserted into his arm.

Stefanoff said he wore clothing woven from hemp fabric when he arrived at the jail, on June 3, 1993. He started a hunger strike when his sentence began, and said he would not eat until President Bill Clinton publicly accepted literature and a brochure about the usefulness of hemp from him. Stefanoff was put under medical supervision and ended his hunger strike on July 6, after 34 days.

=== Hemp City ===
During Stefanoff's hunger strike, his supporters camped out in front of the jail in a tent city called Hemp Town, which grew as followers joined. Ptak was awarded High Times magazine's Freedom Fighter of the Month for his leadership in facilitating the demonstration. Vicki Hartin was another local leader. Stahl was one of the supporters during the encampment outside the jail and he started a hunger strike at the same time as Stefanoff, which lasted 16 days. A half-dozen tents on the lawn next to the police station housed 20 activists. The San Antonio Express-News wrote that the protesters regard hemp as a “miracle herb” with great potential as a source of fuel, fiber and medicine.

Nationally, Green Panthers coordinated publicity and public relations for the Hemp City protest.

According to Stahl, the tent city was in front of the jail for more than a month, until they were evicted by sheriff's deputies on July 7, 1993. They moved their tents across the street to the main square in front of the county courthouse in San Marcos until they were asked to leave by police on July 9. Then they relocated to Five Mile Dam, a county park just outside San Marcos, where Hemp City remained for another month, until August, 1993.

=== Arrests of supporters ===
On July 4, 1993, Billy Jack Williams turned himself in for marijuana possession in an act of civil disobedience in support of Stefanoff inside the jail. Williams was freed after posting a bond.

Two days later, on July 6, 1993, Stahl was arrested for trespassing when he refused to leave the jail property. A jury, in 1994, found Stahl not guilty of trespassing.

=== Stefanoff's lawsuit ===
Stefanoff filed a lawsuit against Hays County, and the sheriff personally, for refusing to release him early for good conduct. The case was dismissed in 1998.

== After 1993 ==
Ptak was arrested and stood trial in 1996 for possession of 1.5 grams of marijuana. He mounted a successful legal defense on grounds of medical necessity, which he said was the first such successful defense in Texas.

In 1997, Stefanoff was arrested for possessing about 2 pounds of marijuana. At his trial he offered a medical necessity defense and said that he used marijuana to alleviate the symptoms of posttraumatic stress disorder as a Vietnam War Army veteran. The jury found him guilty. He appealed the conviction and sentence and lost.

In 1997, Ptak and Stefanoff continued their free speech activism and started a pirate radio station called Micro KIND Radio 105.9 FM.

Stefanoff ran unsuccessfully for Hays County commissioner, and sheriff. Rodriguez Scales ran for mayor, justice of the peace, and council in San Marcos. Dodd, a student at the time of the protests, became employed by the Women's International League for Peace and Freedom.

In 2000, at a march and rally at the Texas State Capitol in Austin that included about 300 people, Stefanoff encouraged people to engage in civil disobedience, like he did, as a way of forcing the end to cannabis prohibition.

== See also ==
- Cannabis and religion
- Cannabis in Texas
- Freedom of speech in the United States
- Fully Informed Jury Association
- Industrial hemp
- Texas NORML
