= Laura Kriho =

American cannabis legalization advocate

Laura Jean Kriho (July 23, 1964 – January 30, 2017) was an American cannabis legalization advocate and was also known for her part in a jury nullification trial in the mid-1990s. Kriho was also involved in the Cannabis Therapy Institute and in the push for the adoption of Amendment 20 in the Colorado Constitution. She advocated against Colorado Amendment 64, however, which she viewed as not true legalization. She petitioned the state with her own cannabis legalization language but never went for ballot title/signature collection.

== Biography ==
Kriho was born in Chicago and she moved to Boulder, Colorado after she graduated from high school. Kriho worked for state senator Lloyd Casey in the 1990s. She also worked as a college research assistant.

Kriho was a juror in a 1996 case of methamphetamine possession in Gilpin County, Colorado. The entire jury voted the defendant guilty of providing a false ID but not guilty on paraphernalia possession. When it came to drug possession, only Kriho voted not guilty. She felt that, since they all agreed the paraphernalia was not the defendant's, it wouldn't make sense for the meth to be considered hers, either. Kriho believed that the accused young woman's drug charge should be solved through family counseling, not through the courts. During the jury deliberation, Kriho discussed the type of sentence the woman involved in the case might get and also "questioned the reasonableness of such drug laws." She also gave out a leaflet to another juror that discussed juries choosing to "make the right decision when the law is wrong." Another juror revealed what Kriho had discussed and Judge Kenneth Barnhill declared the case a mistrial. Barnhill responded by issuing a criminal contempt of court citation against Kriho.

She was also charged with obstruction of justice. The judge in this case, Henry Nieto, held that, even though she was not asked her views on the enforcement of drug laws, she obstructed justice by not volunteering them during jury selection. Kriho had not disclosed (because she was never asked by the judge or the prosecutor) that she had pled guilty to possessing LSD when she was 19 and that she was a member of a group supporting the legalization of marijuana. She was fined $1,200.

Kriho appealed the decision. In 1999, the conviction was overturned on appeal because the trial judge relied on statements from jury deliberation in the process of finding her guilty. On August 4, 2000 all charges against Kriho were dismissed, ending the case. However, while Kriho's conviction itself was overturned, the reasoning behind the reversal leaves open the possibility that other jurors may be similarly prosecuted in the future.

Kriho continued to advocate for the legalization of marijuana. She was involved in working towards medical marijuana in Colorado, resulting in Amendment 20 to the Colorado Constitution. When Amendment 64 passed, Kriho was actually critical of it because she felt that its regulations for cannabis were too restrictive. She was involved with the Cannabis Therapy Institute.

In 2014, Kriho was hired as a publication coordinator at the University of Colorado in the College of Arts and Sciences. Kriho was reported to be ill for a few months before her death on January 30, 2017 and had been working from home.
