= Ontario Cannabis Retail Corporation =

Provincial cannabis distributor and online retailer

- Trade name: Ontario Cannabis Store
- Type: Crown corporation
- Industry: Online Retail, Wholesale
- Founded: 2017; 9 years ago
- Headquarters: Ontario, Canada
- Key people: David Lobo, President & CEO
- Products: Recreational cannabis sales and distribution to both consumers and businesses
- Owner: Government of Ontario
- Website: ocs.ca

The Ontario Cannabis Retail Corporation, operating as Ontario Cannabis Store (OCS), is a Crown corporation that manages a legal monopoly over the online retail and wholesale distribution of recreational cannabis to consumers and privately operated brick and mortar retailers respectively throughout Ontario, Canada.

== Founding ==
After the federal government announced recreational use of cannabis would be legalized in 2017 or early 2018, then Premier Kathleen Wynne commented the LCBO stores might be the ideal distribution network for stocking, controlling and selling such products. The Ontario Public Service Employees Union (OPSEU), which represents LCBO staff, also lobbied for the LCBO to have a monopoly on cannabis sales.

In response to the federal Task Force on Marijuana Legalization and Regulation recommendation against selling cannabis in conjunction with alcohol, in September 2017, the Ontario government announced the LCBO would be the sole vendor of recreational marijuana to the public in that province, but not through the 651 stores that sell alcoholic beverages. The Ontario Cannabis Retail Corporation (OCRC), was established as a subsidiary of the LCBO with a mandate to initially open 40 stores before legalization took effect in October 2018. OCRC also entered a partnership with Shopify to use the company's platform for operating the province's online cannabis sales. In March 2018, OCRC adopted the trading name Ontario Cannabis Store for its retail services. The OCS logo, designed by a Canadian subsidiary of Leo Burnett Worldwide as part of a $650,000 marketing and branding contract, was derided as "boring" and "underwhelming".

== Change in mandate ==
Following the 2018 provincial election, the new provincial government led by Premier Doug Ford announced the OCRC would not be opening physical stores and that cannabis sales in Ontario would instead be conducted by private stores. Under this new model, the OCRC continues to operate the provincial online cannabis sales service and serves as the wholesale supplier for private stores in Ontario. The Alcohol and Gaming Commission of Ontario is responsible for the regulation and licensing of private cannabis stores in province. The OCRC was also reorganized to operate directly under the Ministry of Finance rather than as a subsidiary of the LCBO.

=== Brick-and-mortar stores ===
The OCS does not operate any physical stores itself, but it supplies cannabis products to licensed private retailers in Ontario. The private retailers are regulated and licensed by the Alcohol and Gaming Commission of Ontario (AGCO). Initially, the Ontario government planned to limit the number of retail outlets for cannabis to 25, operated by private enterprise, and to allocate them through a lottery system. Only 25 licences were issued in January 2019, and another 50 were awarded in August 2019. The government continued to operate the online sales business via its Ontario Cannabis Store website.

However, in December 2019, the Ontario government announced that it would eliminate the lottery system and the cap on the number of licences, and that it would allow any qualified applicant to apply for a Retail Operator Licence and a Retail Store Authorization. The new open market model was intended to increase the number of retail outlets in the province, and to reduce the black market for cannabis. Some 20 new licences would be issued per month starting from April 2020. By March 2021, there were 572 authorized cannabis stores operating in Ontario, compared to just 53 a year earlier.

== Effect on black market ==
The black market remained persistent as of October 2019, partly because of a lack of retail outlets in many communities and because of the lower prices charged of illicit product. Illicit sales accounted for 86% of the Canadian market, with prices being 30-35% lower on average according to a report. As of September 2020, the legal market had gained ground. OCS said the legal market made up 25.1% of sales. The average price for dried flower on the OCS had fallen to $7.05 per gram after taxes, compared to the average price for illicit cannabis at $7.98 per gram. The growth is also attributed to an increase in brick-and-mortar retail, with 110 stores operating as of Q3 2020, compared to just 22 at the same time last year.

== See also ==
- Cannabis in Ontario
