= Matías Faray =

Argentine cannabis rights activist

Matías Faray (born 1979) is a cannabis rights activist from Argentina and member of the West Cannabis Grower Association. (Spanish: Agrupación Cannabicultores del Oeste)

On 14 April 2011, Faray was raided by the police while he was leaving his home in Morón. He was charged with drugs trafficking after the police searched his house and found twenty five cannabis plants, seeds and other elements he used for indoor cultivation. However, legal spokesman of Morón denied this version. In addition to this, a firearm was also found during the operation. When facing the prosecutors Faray lectured them on cannabis cultivation, medical properties of marijuana and said he was committed to the cause of decriminalization. His defense was managed by cannabis magazine THC. He spent the next fifteen days after the arrest in preventive prison under the charge of cultivating cannabis. Representative Victoria Donda said the detention was unjust and that the State should not prosecute self-sufficient consumers. After being released he stated prisons are full of drug addicts or social consumers while drug lords are free profiting.

Faray was a high-profile cannabis activist before the raid took place.

== See also ==
- Legality of cannabis
- Cannabis cultivation
