= Global Marijuana March =

Annual rally

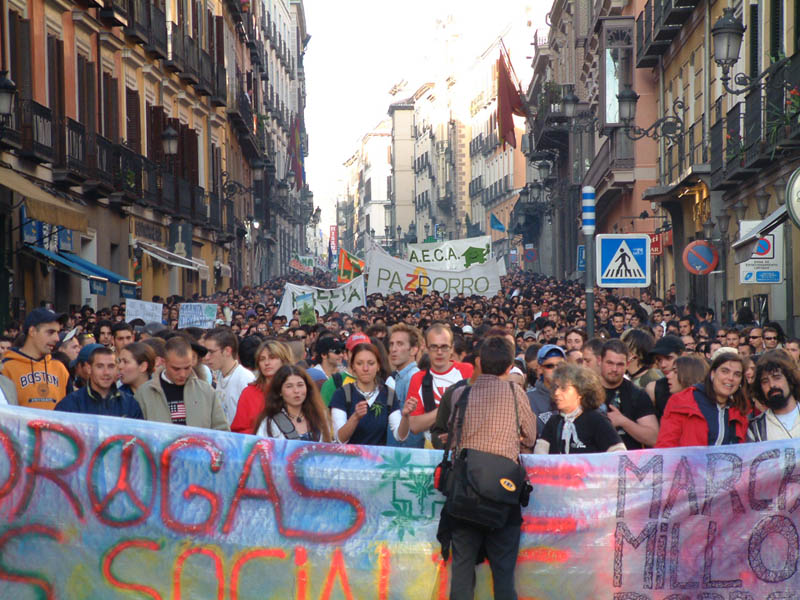
Madrid, Spain. May 8, 2004. Million Joint March (La Marcha del Millón de Porros en Madrid, Mayo 2004), part of the Million Marijuana March.

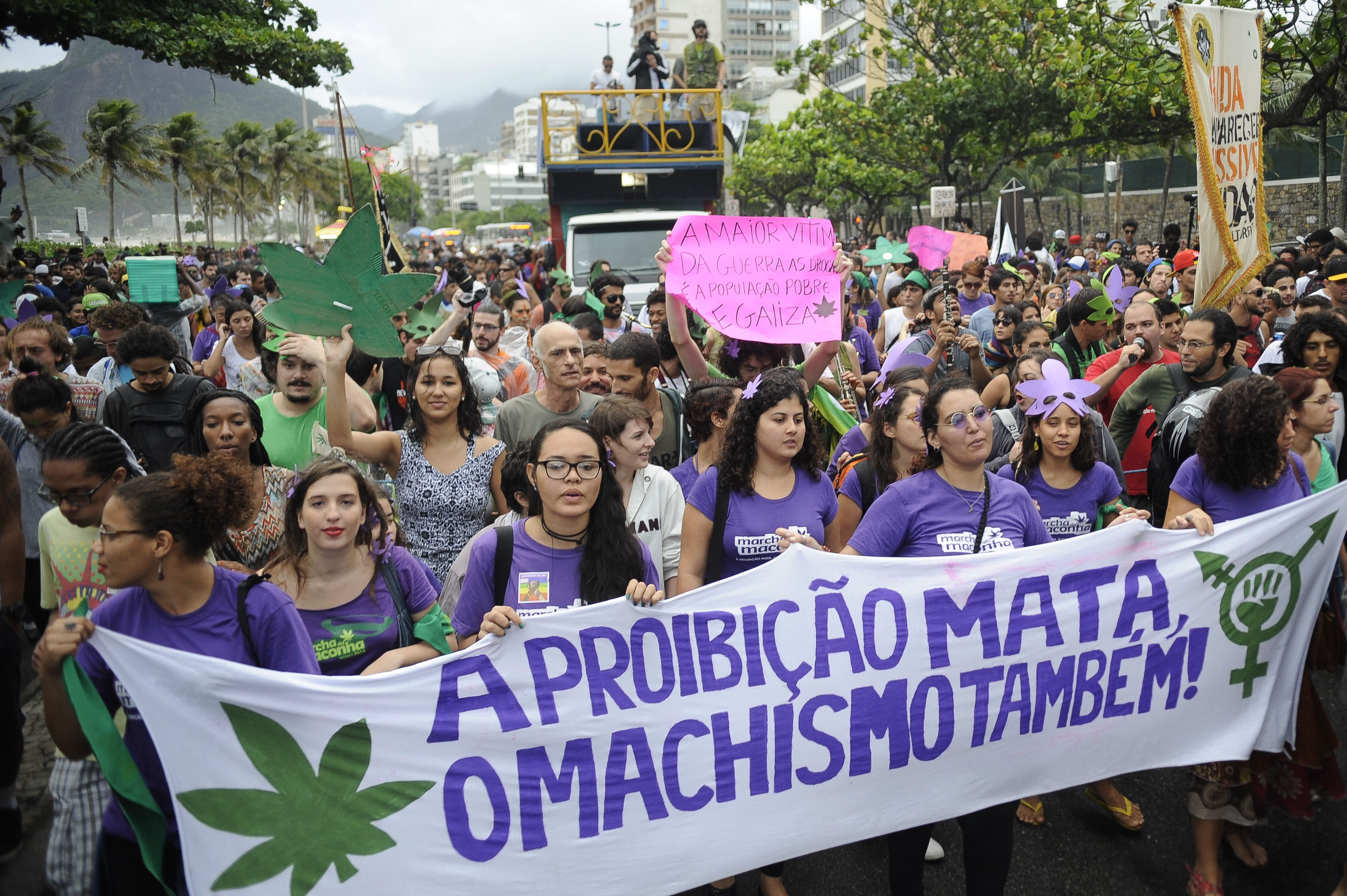
Rio de Janeiro, Brazil. May 10, 2014. Marcha da maconha.

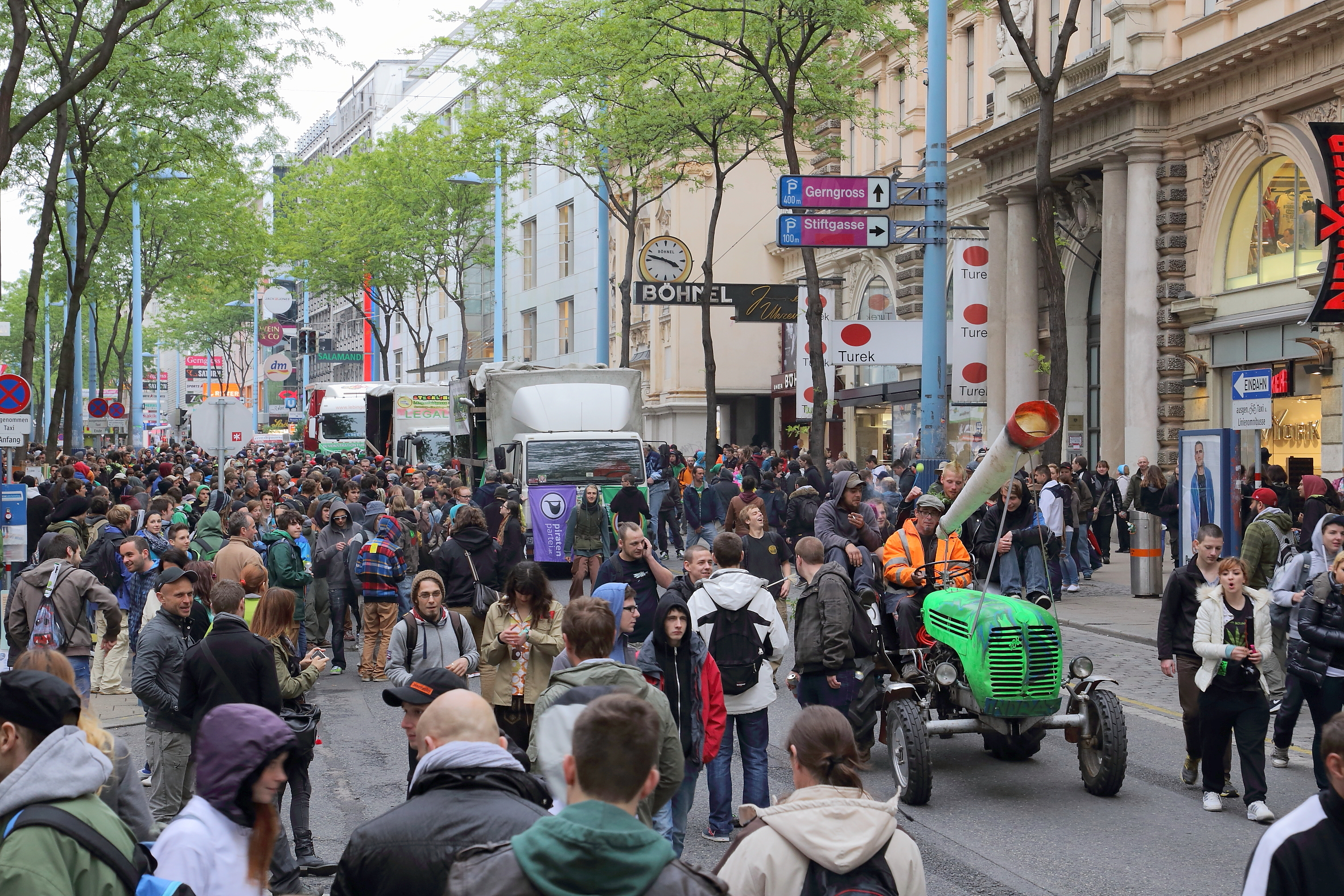
Vienna, Austria. May 3, 2014. Hanfwandertag.

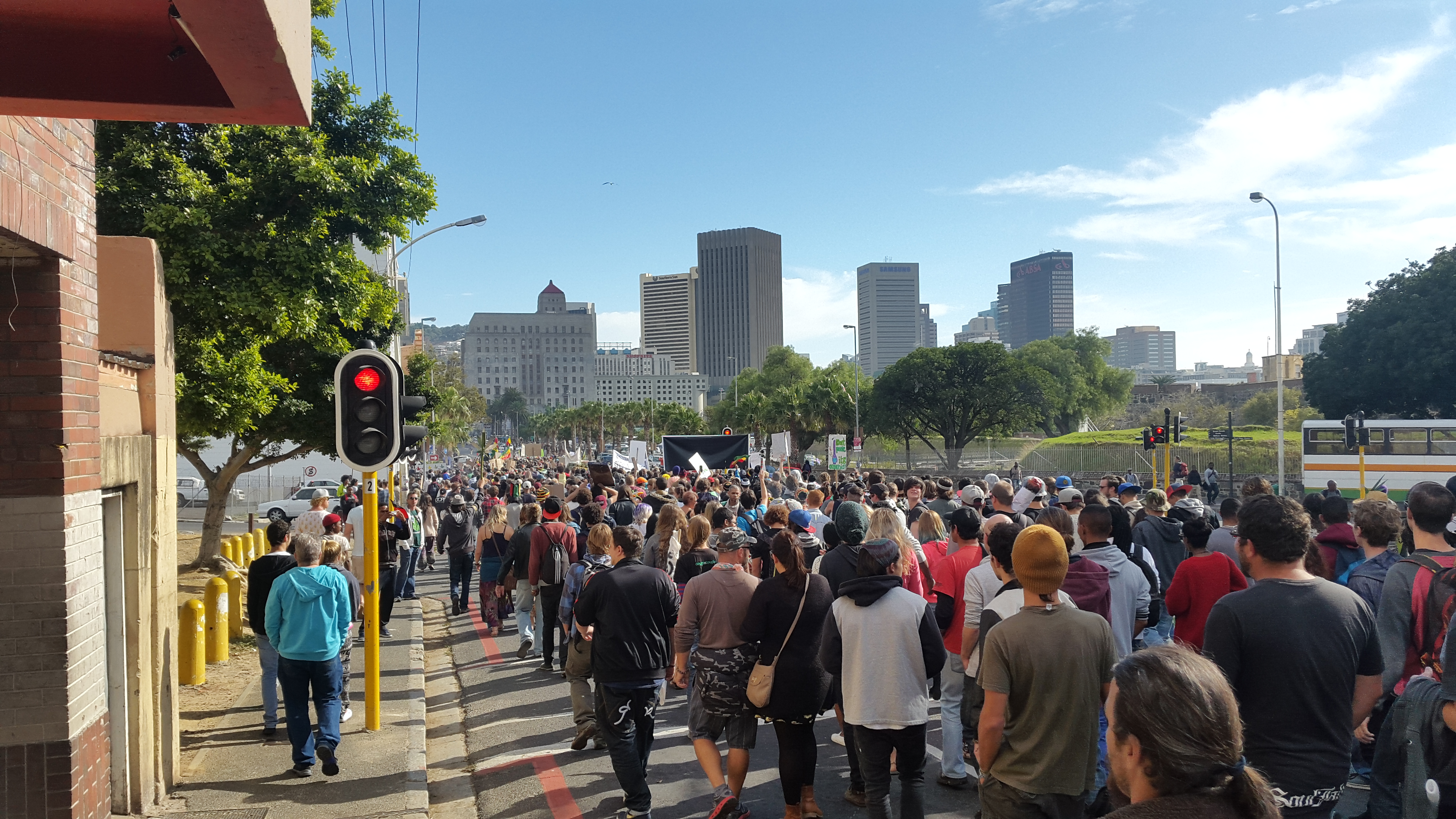
People marching in the streets of Cape Town against the prohibition of cannabis in South Africa, May 9, 2015

The Global Marijuana March (GMM), also referred to as the Million Marijuana March, is an annual rally held at different locations around the world on the first Saturday in May. A notable event in cannabis culture, it is associated with cannabis-themed events, which may include marches, meetings, rallies, raves, concerts, festivals, and attempts at educational outreach.

The first Global Marijuana March was held in 1999. Since then, hundreds of thousands of people have participated in over 1034 different cities in 85 nations and subnational areas. Locally, the Global Marijuana March is associated with names including Global Cannabis March, World Cannabis Day, Cannabis Liberation Day, Global Space Odyssey, Ganja Day, J Day, and Million Blunts March.

== Events by country ==
=== Brazil ===
On June 15, 2011, the eight ministers of Brazil's Supreme Court (STF) that participated in the trial were unanimous in free demonstrations for the legalization of drugs, such as the Marcha da Maconha (Portuguese pronunciation: [ˈmaʁʃɐ da mɐˈkõɲɐ], Marijuana Walk) in Brazil, in which they decided that the demonstrations are an exercise of freedom of expression and not incitement to crime, as argued judges who have banned the march in the past. The discussion of the Marcha da Maconha reached the Supreme Court in June 2009 when the Deputy Attorney General of the Republic Deborah Duprat filed the claim of breach of fundamental precept, ADPF 187. In the lawsuit, the attorney states that the legal prohibition of the demonstrations in favor of marijuana and other narcotics have been based on misinterpretation of the Criminal Code. She said that it is "wrong" to say that the realization of these events are an "apology to crime".

Marijuana was brought to Brazil by its African slaves, and with the eugenic positivist intellectual and political status quo of the Western civilization in the early 20th century, its use was deemed as a signal of decadence by its stigmatized use as a recreational drug of the poor, the rural people and the Afro-Brazilian. Its association with the counterculture and left-wing youths during the highly anti-Communist military dictatorship, initially a strong ally of the United States' government, fortified its negative perceptions both by the authorities and the masses. Nevertheless, since the neoliberal centre-right government of Fernando Henrique Cardoso (1994–2002), position strengthened in the so-called Era Lula (2003–2010), individual marijuana use by adults started to have no major importance to police and government instances – though not (since the country has major crime problems with drug dealers) its domestic cultivation for own consumption. One can see and smell people smoking the so-called maconha openly in Brazil's Centre-Southern half as well as in the Northeastern states, and recreational use of cannabis in private became more accepted among large sectors of the middle classes since the early 1990s. The academic milieu is no exception and, today, a sizeable minority of Brazilian University lecturers, students and researchers smoke marijuana.

=== Canada ===
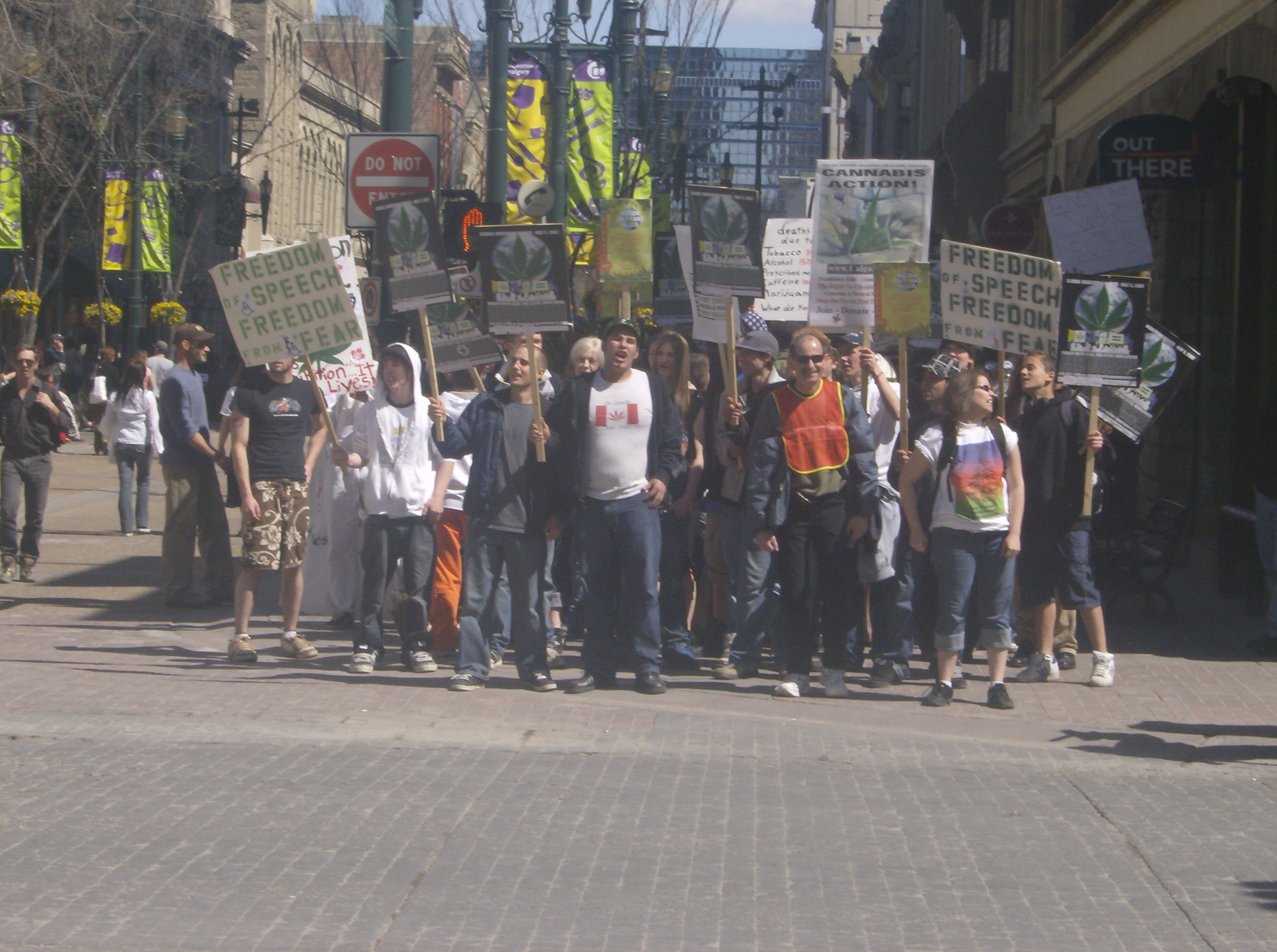
Calgary, Alberta, Canada. May 5, 2007. Global Marijuana March.

==== Toronto, Ontario ====
The rally at Queen's Park in Toronto, Ontario, Canada has been held since 1999. 20,000 people participated in 2007, and 15,000 in 2008. For the May 2, 2009 event the Toronto Star reported: "Police estimate roughly 12,000 people filled the north lawns of Queen's Park yesterday afternoon, with about 5,000 participating in a 2 p.m. march to decriminalize marijuana." In 2011 the Toronto Star reported 25,000 at Queen's Park, and 20,000 on the march through downtown. CTV News reported "Tens of thousands march".

==== Regina, Saskatchewan ====
Held in Regina on the first Saturday of May since 1999, originally at the Saskatchewan Legislature. Starting in 2001, it was held in Victoria Park, in the center of Regina's downtown, until 2008 when changes to the city's permit policy forced organizers to change the location to Central Park. The event features live music mixed with speakers on various topics, sometimes with only an incidental connection to marijuana.

==== Vancouver, British Columbia ====
Held in Vancouver, British Columbia, on the first Saturday of May. People gather at the fountain at the Vancouver Art Gallery at or before 2:00 pm for a marijuana legalization parade through the streets of downtown Vancouver. The parade route is different every year.

=== France ===
In France the so-called Marche Mondiale pour le Cannabis is celebrated in Paris, Lyon, Toulouse, Marseille, Rennes, Lille, Saint-Denis-de-la-Réunion, Cognac, and some other minor cities in the country.

=== Japan ===
Marijuana March Tokyo (マリファナマーチ東京) has been held annually since 2001.

=== New Zealand ===
In New Zealand J Day is celebrated in some of the major cities.

==== Dunedin ====
J-Day in Dunedin, is celebrated in the city's centre of town, The Octagon, on the first Saturday of May from 'High Noon' until 4:20 pm. Dunedin is arguably chronologically the first city in the world to host any GMM event. Named '4:20 Extreme', local participants climb the famous Baldwin Street to meet at the top by 4:20 am. Locally J-Day coincides with The University of Otago Capping Parade, in which a multitude of ceremony-attending graduates parade down the main street on their way to the Town Hall ceremony, and also the University Hall Parade, in which University of Otago dormitory-student decorated themed floats parade down the main street, stopping in the Octagon typically armed with many water balloons, and collectively shouting chants of dormitory-specific pride.

Dunedin became famous for its JDay festivities in 2003 when around 50 activists marched to the Central Dunedin Police Station, where they planted cannabis plants and smoked cannabis in the main foyer as acts of protest. The event was given considerable national and international media attention as no arrests were made. The Central Dunedin Police Station was hot-boxed again on JDay in 2004 by over 100 activists, again with no arrests. This second incident was also covered by the media, resulting in the Dunedin Area Police Commander, Dave Campbell, justifying the fact that no arrests were made with the quote, "We had more important things to do" in the Otago Daily Times.

The 2007 International J-Day in Dunedin featured political speakers and music provided by local DJs and counted 170 people at mid-day. In the lead up to J-Day 2008, NORML NZ's Maryjane the Cannabus toured 42 towns between Auckland and Dunedin in 42 days for daily law reform rallies. The Cannabus arrived in Dunedin, New Zealand's most cannabis friendly city, on April 25 for a week-long 'Cannabis Awareness Week' which was planned by Otago NORML and featured public workshops, informational lectures at Otago University, and a round-table discussion featuring university academics, MPs, and policy researchers. Cannabis Awareness Week culminated with J-Day on May 3, 2008.

The 2008 J-Day in Dunedin was well attended despite sleet and hail early in the day. Over 500 supporters participated in the event, enjoying games, prizes, political speeches and music from Bushmaster and Ashes of Eden.

=== Denmark ===
Copenhagen In Copenhagen the Marijuana march has been an annual tradition for more than 15 years. The march takes places on the first Saturday of may and departs from The Freetown Christiania, walks through central Copenhagen and ends at the city hall square. Klaus Trier Tuxen from Danish the Hampepartiet has had a prominent role in organizing the event in recent years. Cannabis smoking is illegal in Denmark, but during the march the police do not enforce this regulation and smoking is de facto allowed during the demonstration.

=== United States ===
==== Los Angeles Million Marijuana March 2011 ====
As of 2011, the Moorish Science Temple of America has been doing the Los Angeles Million Marijuana March for 13 years at Leimert park in Los Angeles, California. The 2-day 2011 celebration marks the first time bands have filled the 2 days. Leimert Park is a famed free speech arena, which has also held Black Panther rallies and more since its inception. Acclaimed rap artist Ditch headlined both days, and was in charge of band booking and advertising. The event went off well with over 2,000 people attending over the 2 days. Ditch was honored for being able to bring unity to that area among so many different races and types of people. Ditch also honored jailed freedom fighter Eddy Lepp at the event. Eddy then called in live to the audience from Federal prison in which he is serving 10 years for cultivation of marijuana. Eddy's wife Linda Lepp was on hand to receive the award. This marks the third time so far that Eddy Lepp has spoken to a live concert audience from prison. Rapper RBX also performed at the Los Angeles march marking the first time in years he has performed in South Central Los Angeles.

==== New York City ====
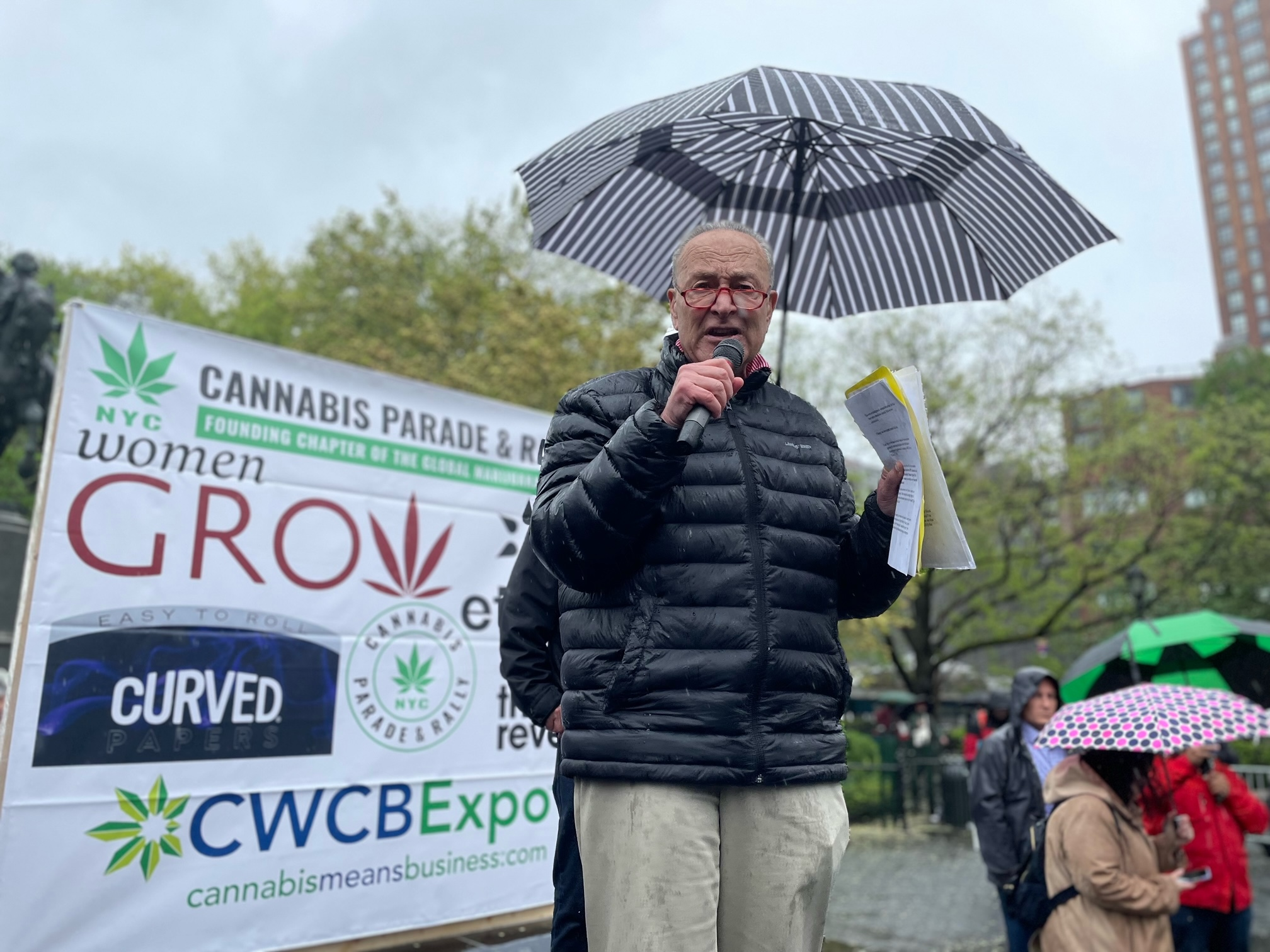
Senate Majority Leader Chuck Schumer speaking at the NYC Cannabis Parade & Rally in 2022

In 1999, during the first worldwide Million Marijuana March New York City held another of its annual marijuana marches. The Village Voice reported on the police and organizer estimates of the crowd size: "the police claim it was 4,000 people while organizers say 20,000".

In 2009, the event organizer, Dana Beal, along with Chris Ryan, and Jay Stetzer on their way back from the NORML Conference in San Francisco all three men were charged with possession with intent to distribute and possession with intent to deliver 150 lbs. of marijuana.

In 2010, the event began to be organized by a new group of activists poised to take on New York city. It was after this that the NYC Event was renamed to, NYC Cannabis Parade. The NYC Cannabis Parade, organized by a steering committee of activists, have turned the event into a celebration of cannabis culture in NYC with a nearly 20 block parade and 4 hour rally preceding it, there has not been a recorded arrest for possession or use for over 4 years now. "'We have zero arrests, and we don’t plan on having any,' one sergeant told a Post reporter. Advocates praised the cops’ mellow take on toking as the latest sign New York was inching toward decriminalization."

== See also ==
- Cannabis rights
- Legality of cannabis
- List of cannabis rights organizations
- 420 (cannabis culture) § International observance of April 20
- Category:Cannabis by country
