= Cannabis in the United States =

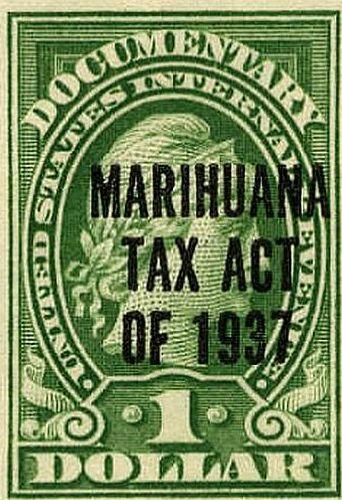
Marihuana Tax Act of 1937 $1 marijuana revenue stamp, 1937 issue

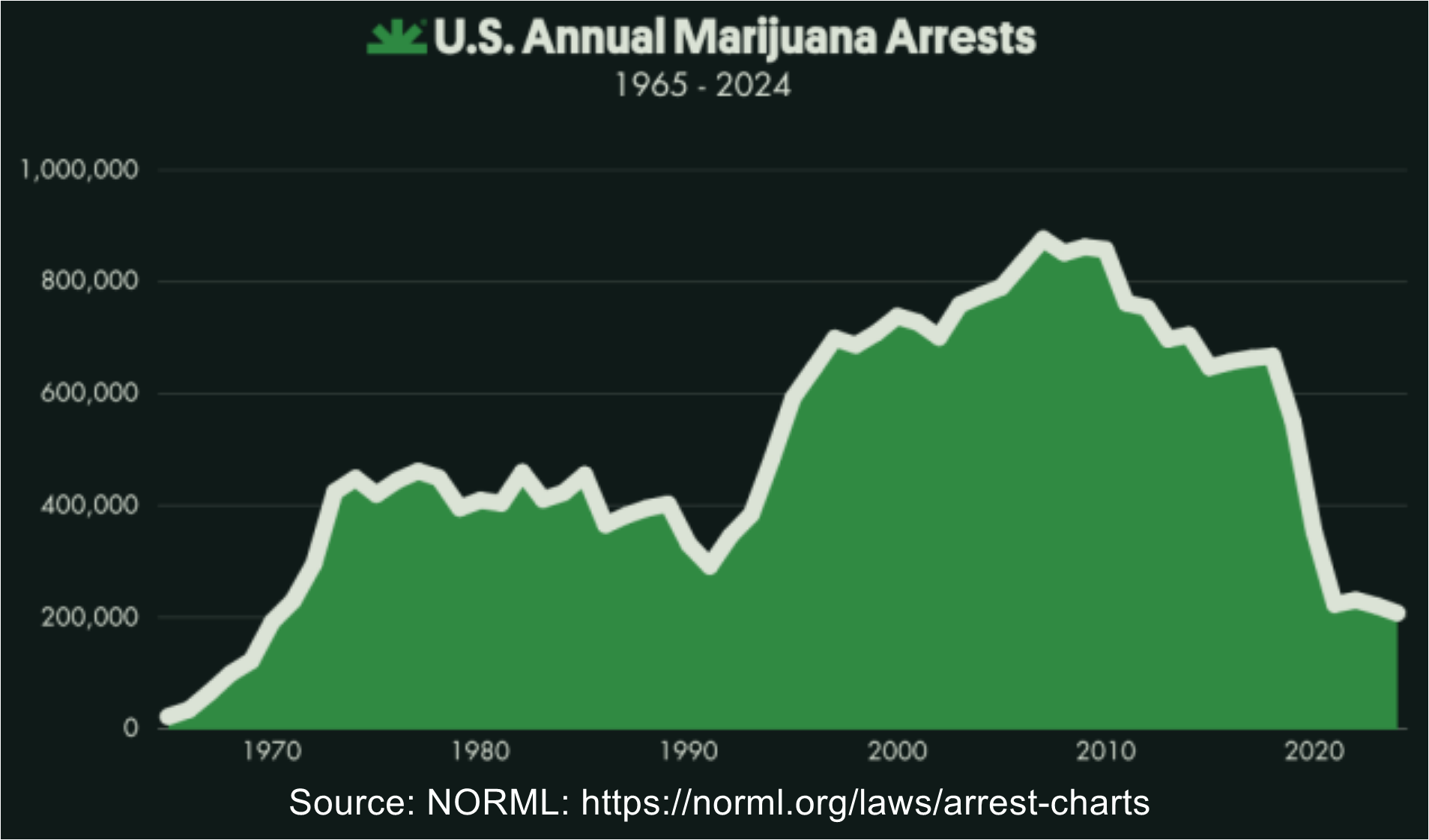
US annual marijuana arrests. NORML.

Cannabis is subject to a complex legal regime in the United States, with conflicting federal and state policies governing medical, industrial, recreational, and other uses. As of April 2026, the use, sale, and possession of cannabis containing over 0.3% THC by dry weight is illegal under federal law except for medical use in some states. As a Schedule I drug under the federal Controlled Substances Act (CSA) of 1970, cannabis was historically considered to have "no accepted medical use" and a high potential for abuse and physical or psychological dependence. As a result, cannabis use was illegal for any reason, with the exception of FDA-approved research programs. However, individual states have enacted legislation permitting exemptions for various uses, including medical, industrial, and recreational uses.

Cannabis for industrial uses (hemp) was made illegal to grow without a permit under the CSA because of its relation to cannabis as a drug, and any imported products must adhere to a zero tolerance policy. The Agricultural Act of 2014 allows for universities and state-level departments of agriculture to cultivate cannabis for research into its industrial potential. In December 2018, hemp was permitted to be grown in the U.S. under federal law after the Hemp Farming Act was included in the passed 2018 Farm Bill.

As a psychoactive drug, cannabis continues to find extensive favor among recreational and medical users in the U.S. As of 2023, twenty-four states, three U.S. territories, and the District of Columbia have legalized recreational use of cannabis. Thirty-eight states, four U.S. territories, and D.C. have legalized medical use of the drug. Multiple efforts to reschedule cannabis under the CSA have failed, and the U.S. Supreme Court has ruled in United States v. Oakland Cannabis Buyers' Cooperative (2001) and Gonzales v. Raich (2005) that the federal government has a right to regulate and criminalize cannabis, whether medical or recreational. As a result, cannabis dispensaries are licensed by each state; these businesses sell cannabis products that have not been approved by the U.S. Food and Drug Administration, nor are they legally registered with the federal government to sell controlled substances. Although cannabis has not been approved, the FDA recognizes the potential benefits and has approved two drugs that contain components of marijuana.

The ability of states to implement cannabis legalization policies was weakened after U.S. Attorney General Jeff Sessions rescinded the Obama administration's Cole Memorandum on January 4, 2018, and issued a new memo instructing U.S. attorneys to enforce federal law related to marijuana. The Cole memo, issued by former Deputy Attorney General James Cole in 2013, urged federal prosecutors to refrain from targeting state-legal marijuana operations. Regarding the medical use of cannabis, the Rohrabacher–Farr amendment still remains in effect to protect state-legal medical cannabis activities from enforcement of federal law. In 2024, the Joe Biden administration began the process of reclassifying marijuana to a Schedule III drug, easing restrictions. On December 18, 2025, President Donald Trump signed an executive order instructing the Attorney General to expedite the process of reclassify cannabis from a Schedule I drug (the most restrictive classification) to Schedule III. On April 23, 2026, the Justice Department issued an order to place FDA-approved products containing cannabis and products regulated by a state medical marijuana license in Schedule III.

== Historic overview ==
The Marihuana Tax Act of 1937 was one of the first measures to tax cannabis nationwide. This act was overturned in 1969 in Leary v. United States, and was repealed and replaced with the Controlled Substances Act (CSA) by Congress the next year. Under the CSA cannabis was assigned a Schedule I classification, deemed to have a high potential for abuse and no accepted medical use – thereby prohibiting even medical use of the drug. The classification has remained since the CSA was first signed into law, despite multiple efforts to reschedule. In direct response, the U.S. Libertarian Party was one of the first major parties to endorse cannabis legalization in their first platform in 1972 which stated, "We favor the repeal of all laws creating "crimes without victims" now incorporated in Federal, state and local laws—such as laws on voluntary sexual relations, drug use, gambling, and attempted suicide." As cannabis prohibition continued into the 21st Century, the U.S. Marijuana Party was formed in 2002 as a single-issue party to end the war on drugs and to legalize cannabis. States have also begun to engage in the process of nullification to override federal laws pertaining to cannabis. California started the trend by legalizing medicinal cannabis in 1996. Now, cannabis has been fully legalized for recreational use in 24 states, three U.S. territories and Washington D.C., with most states having some sort of state nullification of federal cannabis laws. In 1969, Gallup conducted a poll asking Americans whether "the use of marijuana should be legal" with only 12% at the time saying yes. In 1977, it rose to 28% and experienced a period of gradual increase thereafter. According to the latest poll, two-thirds of Americans think marijuana use should be legal. In addition, a report by Business Insider indicates that in 2022 alone, Americans spent an estimated $30 billion on legal marijuana products. The report further predicts that legal pot sales could surpass $33 billion in the current year, surpassing combined sales of chocolate and craft beer.

== Usage ==
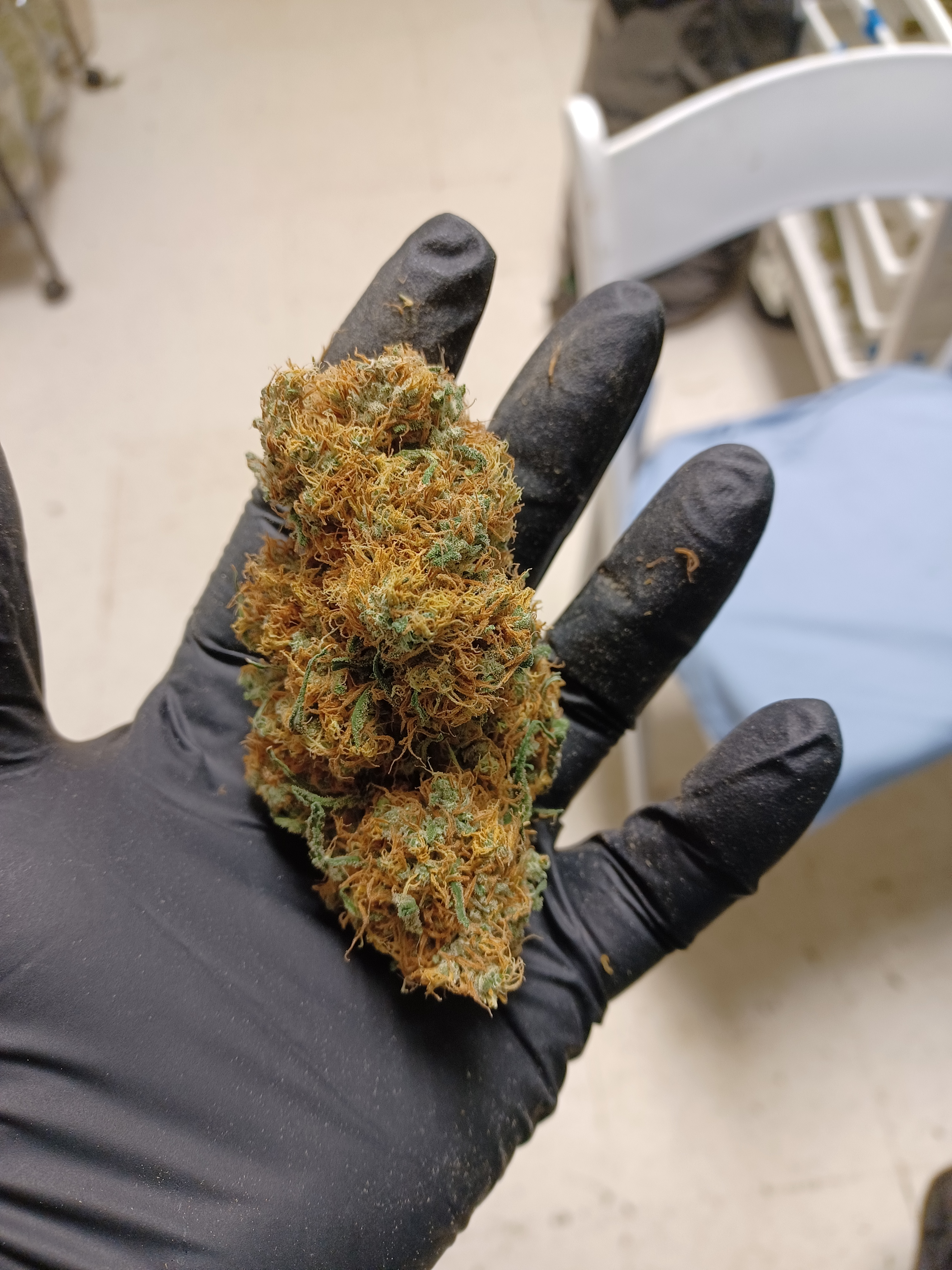
A large cannabis flower bud, Alaska

Roger Roffman, a professor of social work at the University of Washington, asserted in July 2013 that "approximately 3.6 million Americans are daily or near daily users." Peter Reuter, a professor at the School of Public Policy and the Department of Criminology at the University of Maryland, College Park, said that "experimenting with marijuana has long been a normal part of growing up in the U.S.; about half of the population born since 1960 has tried the drug by age 21." A World Health Organization survey found that the U.S. is the world's leading per capita marijuana consumer. The 2007 National Survey on Drug Use & Health prepared by the U.S. Department of Health and Human Services indicated that 14.4 million U.S. citizens over the age of 12 had used marijuana within a month. The 2008 survey found that 35 million Americans were willing to tell government representatives that they had used marijuana in the past year.

According to the 2001 National Survey on Drug Use and Health by the Substance Abuse and Mental Health Services Administration, a branch of the U.S. Department of Health and Human Services, 41.9% (more than 2 in 5) of all Americans 12 or older have used cannabis at some point in their lives, while 11.5% (about 1 in 9) reported using it "this year." According to a 2022 Gallup survey, 16% of Americans reported being marijuana smokers (up from 7% in 2013) and 48% reported trying marijuana at some point in their lifetimes (up from 4% in 1969).

Medical use is a common reason people buy cannabis online. According to the National Institute on Drug Abuse, "Medical marijuana refers to using the whole unprocessed marijuana plant or its basic extracts to treat a disease or symptom." While some report symptom relief from buying cannabis online, scientific evidence on its effectiveness remains inconsistent. More research is needed to confirm its benefits and evaluate potential risks. The U.S. Food and Drug Administration (FDA) has not officially approved marijuana as a medicine.

=== Health effects ===
Approximately 18 million adults, nearly a third of users aged 18 and older, have reported symptoms of cannabis use disorder, according to a data analysis by a Columbia University epidemiologist for The New York Times. This reflects ongoing use despite significant negative impacts, with around three million individuals classified as addicted. These estimates are based on the 2022 U.S. national drug use survey, which focused on individuals who reported cannabis consumption in the past year. Among those aged 18 to 25, over 4.5 million reported using cannabis daily or nearly every day, and 81 percent of these users met the criteria for cannabis use disorder. Wilson Compton, deputy director of the National Institute on Drug Abuse, noted that this suggests that almost all daily users report problems related to their use, and that it is "a very clear warning sign." In 2023, the federal government's National Survey on Drug Use and Health reported a cannabis use disorder rate of 16.6 percent among individuals aged 18 to 25, which was comparable to the rate of alcohol use disorder at 15.1 percent.

Cannabinoid hyperemesis syndrome, resulting from heavy cannabis use, is characterized by nausea, vomiting, and abdominal pain. It can lead to severe dehydration, seizures, kidney failure, and cardiac arrest, with at least eight reported deaths in the United States. Since its documentation in 2004, there has been a significant rise in reported cases. Accurate tracking of the condition is difficult due to inconsistent recording in medical records. Researchers estimate that up to one-third of near-daily cannabis users in the U.S. may experience symptoms, ranging from mild to severe, affecting approximately six million people. The rise of the syndrome in the past two decades coincides with the expansion of marijuana legalization in the United States. According to data from the nonprofit Health Care Cost Institute, cannabis-related diagnoses among individuals under 65 with employer-paid insurance increased by over 50 percent nationwide between 2016 and 2022, rising from approximately 341,000 to 522,000. The organization stated that these figures "almost certainly" represent an undercount.

In 2017, the National Academies of Sciences, Engineering, and Medicine released a review of research on the health effects of cannabis, highlighting that the absence of evidence-based information represents a public health risk.

== Legality ==
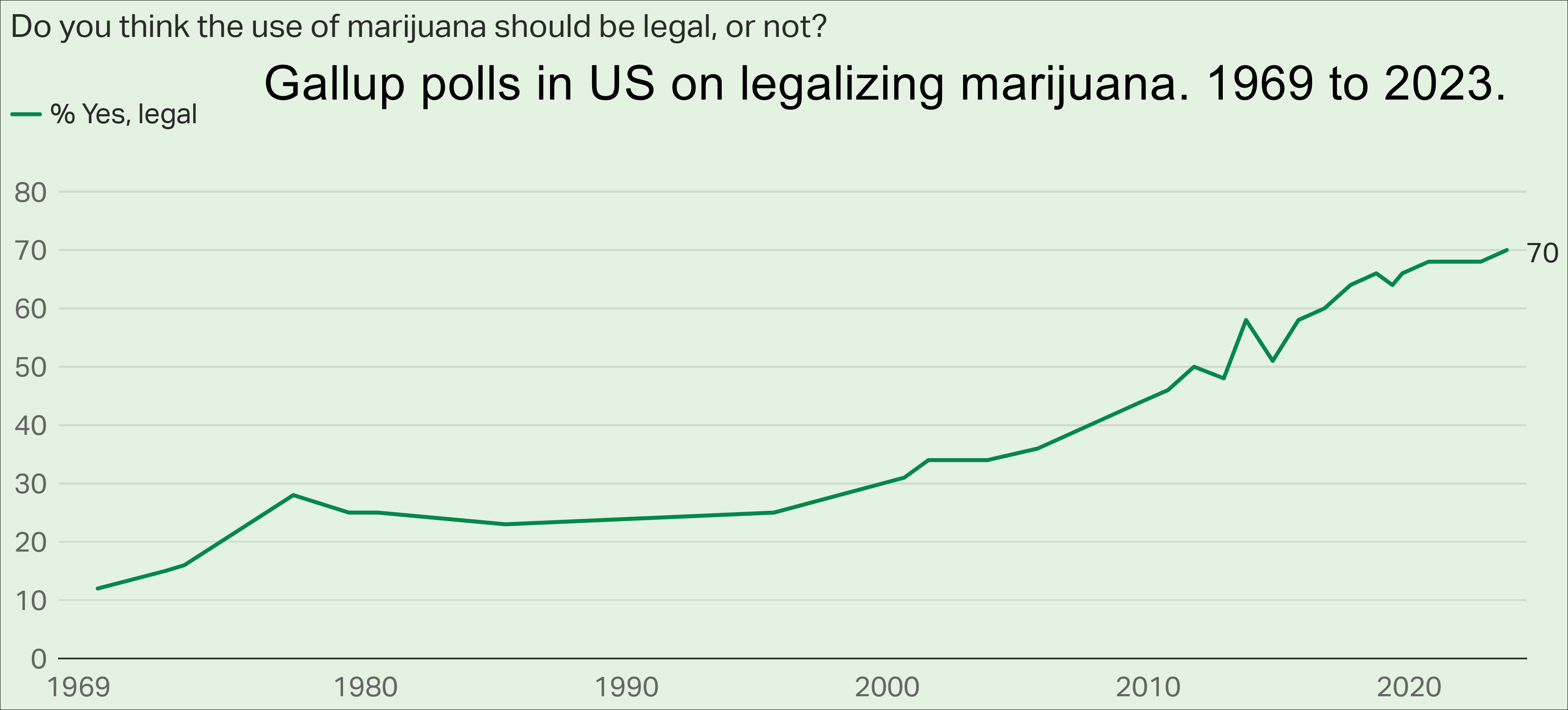
Timeline of Gallup polls in US on legalizing marijuana. See data table below.

Gallup polls. Do you think the use of marijuana should be legal, or not?
Date	% Yes, legal
Oct/1/2025	64
Oct/1/2024	68
Oct/2/2023	70
Oct/3/2022	68
Oct/1/2021	68
Oct/1/2020	68
Oct/1/2019	66
May/15/2019	64
Oct/1/2018	66
Oct/5/2017	64
Oct/5/2016	60
Oct/7/2015	58
Oct/12/2014	51
Oct/3/2013	58
Nov/26/2012	48
Oct/6/2011	50
Oct/7/2010	46
Oct/1/2009	44
Oct/13/2005	36
Nov/10/2003	34
Aug/3/2001	34
Aug/29/2000	31
Aug/28/1995	25
May/17/1985	23
Jun/27/1980	25
May/18/1979	25
Apr/1/1977	28
Jan/26/1973	16
May/3/1972	15
Oct/2/1969	12

=== Federal ===
Since the Controlled Substances Act of 1970 classified marijuana as a Schedule I drug, until the passage of the 2018 United States farm bill, under federal law it was illegal to possess, use, buy, sell, or cultivate cannabis in all U.S. jurisdictions. As a Schedule I substance, the highest restriction of five different schedules of controlled substances, it is claimed cannabis has a high potential for abuse and has no acceptable medical use. Despite this federal prohibition, some state and local governments established laws attempting to decriminalize cannabis, which has reduced the number of "simple possession" offenders sent to jail, since federal law enforcement rarely targets individuals directly for such relatively minor offenses. Other state and local governments ask law enforcement agencies to limit enforcement of drug laws with respect to cannabis. However, under the Supremacy Clause of the U.S. Constitution, federal law preempts conflicting state and local laws. In most cases, the absence of a state law does not present a preemption conflict with a federal law.

The federal government criminalized marijuana under the Interstate Commerce Clause, and the application of these laws to intrastate commerce were addressed squarely by the U.S. Supreme Court in Gonzales v. Raich, 545 U.S. 1, in 2005.

In January 2009, President Barack Obama's transition team organized a poll to clarify some of the top issues the American public wants to have his administration look into, and two of the top ten ideas were to legalize the use of cannabis. In July 2009, Gil Kerlikowske, Director of the Office of National Drug Control Policy, clarified the federal government's position when he stated that "marijuana is dangerous and has no medicinal benefit" and that "legalization is not in the president's vocabulary, and it's not in mine." However, a January 2010 settlement between the U.S. Drug Enforcement Administration and the Wo/Men's Alliance for Medical Marijuana (WAMM) provided an example confirming the administration policy as communicated by Attorney General Eric Holder, as WAMM reached an agreement that allowed them to re-open after being shut down by the federal government in 2002.

Following the 2012 presidential election, the Office of National Drug Control Policy under the Obama administration stated that it "steadfastly opposes legalization of marijuana and other drugs because legalization would increase the availability and use of illicit drugs, and pose significant health and safety risks". In February 2014, the administration issued guidelines to banks for conducting transactions with legal marijuana sellers so these new businesses can stash away savings, make payroll, and pay taxes like any other enterprise. However, marijuana businesses still lack access to banks and credit unions due to Federal Reserve regulations.

On August 29, 2013, the Justice Department adopted a new policy (known as the Cole memo) regarding the enforcement of federal law in states that have legalized non-medical cannabis. The policy specified that commercial distribution of cannabis would be generally tolerated, except in certain circumstances, such as if violence or firearms are involved, the proceeds go to gangs and cartels, or if the cannabis is distributed to states where it is illegal.

On December 11, 2014, the Department of Justice told U.S. attorneys to allow Native American tribes on reservations to grow and sell marijuana, even in states where it is illegal. The policy will be implemented on a case-by-case basis and tribes must still follow federal guidelines.

On May 30, 2014, the U.S. House of Representatives passed the Rohrabacher–Farr amendment, prohibiting the Justice Department from spending funds to interfere with the implementation of state medical marijuana laws. The amendment became law in December 2014, and must be renewed each year in order to remain in effect.

On March 10, 2015, U.S. Senators Rand Paul, Kirsten Gillibrand, and Cory Booker introduced the Compassionate Access, Research Expansion and Respect States Act or CARERS Act. The bipartisan bill would move cannabis from Schedule I to Schedule II of the Controlled Substances Act. This would allow states with medical cannabis laws to legally prescribe it, and allow for much easier research into its medical efficacy. The bill would also allow grow sites besides the University of Mississippi, which has long been the sole supplier of cannabis for academic research, to supply cannabis for study.

The Food and Drug Administration has approved two synthetic cannabis drugs for treating cancer and other medical issues. The federal government of the U.S. continues to argue that smoked cannabis has no recognized medical purpose (pointing to a definition of "medical purpose" published by the DEA, not the Food and Drug Administration, the National Institutes of Health, the Centers for Disease Control, or the office of the U.S. Surgeon General and the U.S. Public Health Service). Many officials point to the difficulty of regulating dosage of cannabis (a problem for treatment as well as research), despite the availability (in Canada and the United Kingdom) of dosage-controlled Sativex. The U.S. has also pressured other governments (especially Canada and Mexico, with which it shares borders) to retain restrictions on marijuana.

On January 4, 2018, the Cole memo was rescinded by Attorney General Jeff Sessions, restoring the ability of US Attorneys to enforce federal law in states that have legalized non-medical cannabis.

On December 20, 2018, President Donald Trump signed the farm bill which descheduled hemp, making cannabis under 0.3% THC legal once again. The law may have inadvertently allowed cultivation of hemp plants with high levels of delta-8-THC, which is also psychoactive and has since become more popular recreationally across the U.S.

In February 2019, three researchers used MedMen as a case study to illustrate their concerns with marijuana companies' marketing practices. The authors criticized MedMen's use of health claims without health warnings and their appeals to youth. They called for federal regulators to investigate the marketing practices of MedMen and other US-based marijuana companies.

In June 2021, Supreme Court justice Clarence Thomas stated that "A prohibition on interstate use or cultivation of marijuana may no longer be necessary or proper to support the federal government's piecemeal approach," criticizing "[t]he federal government's ... half-in, half-out regime that simultaneously tolerates and forbids local use of marijuana."

In 2022, President Joe Biden released a budget proposal that did not extend protections for states violating federal laws around marijuana. It also did not give the District of Columbia permission to legalize, which drew mild surprise among political observers given the Democratic Party's support of D.C. autonomy.

In July 2022, Cannabis Administration and Opportunity Act "CAOA" (see Text of S.4591)' was introduced by Senators Cory Booker (D-NJ), Chuck Schumer) (D-NY), and Ron Wyden (D-OR) with the aim of decriminalizing cannabis on the federal level and officially acknowledging states' own marijuana laws. Even though the bill includes both Democratic and Republican priorities, it appears unlikely to pass.

Former U.S. President Joe Biden discusses rescheduling of cannabis.

While marijuana has been decriminalized throughout many states in the US, it remains a Schedule I drug as of October 2024. However, on January 12, 2024, the FDA announced its recommendation that marijuana be moved to a Schedule III drug, which is a much less strictly-regulated category and would acknowledge its potential for medical use. If marijuana is rescheduled according to these recommendations, it would no longer be placed alongside drugs such as heroin and, instead, be placed alongside drugs such as ketamine.

This process is very lengthy, and first required a two month period for public comment, from May 21 to July 22. There were nearly 43,000 comments in total, about 69% of whom stated the government should instead decriminalize marijuana entirely, with 23% supporting the move and 8% wanting marijuana to remain a schedule I drug. Since then, a public hearing has been scheduled for December 2, and reclassification will not occur until after then.

Marijuana's status and classification under federal law hinders oversight and scientific research. States have implemented inconsistent standards and regulations, with only two states capping THC levels in most recreational marijuana products and just ten requiring warnings about the potential for habit formation. Even fewer states mandate warnings regarding cannabinoid hyperemesis syndrome or psychosis, and none are equipped to monitor or assess the full range of health outcomes related to cannabis use. A 2024 report from the National Academies of Sciences highlights the inconsistent legal framework surrounding cannabis legalization, which prioritizes sales revenue and taxes over public health. The report calls for a more unified approach to cannabis regulation, including a federal campaign to educate the public about the risks of increasingly potent cannabis products. It also advocates for lifting restrictions on cannabis research to better understand its health impacts. The CDC is urged to take a more active role in shaping cannabis policy, but additional funding would be required to implement these recommendations.

=== State ===
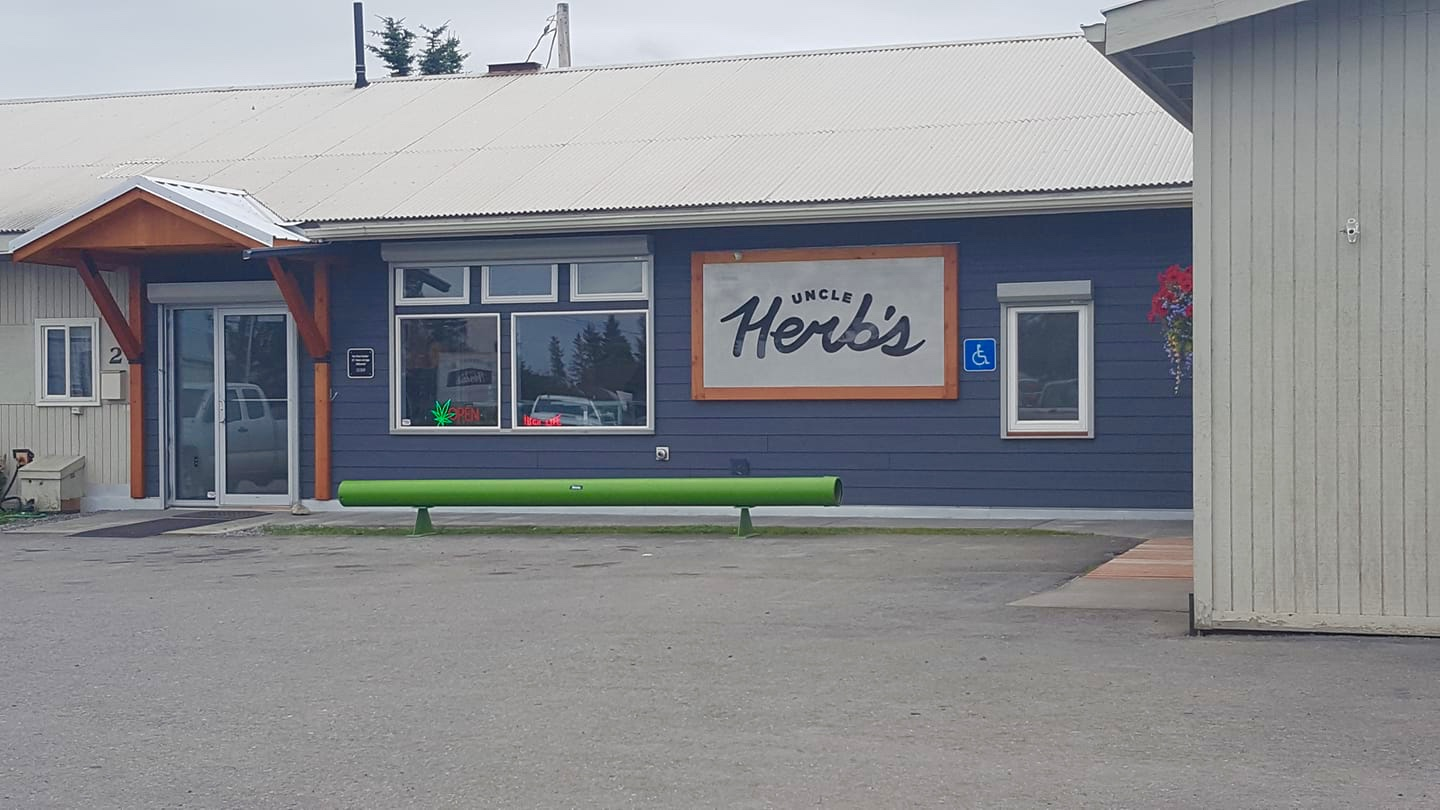
Retail store, Homer, Alaska

In 1973 Oregon became the first state to decriminalize cannabis, and in 2012 Colorado and Washington became the first states to legalize recreational use. As of November 2023, twenty-four states (Alaska, Arizona, California, Colorado, Connecticut, Delaware, Illinois, Maine, Maryland, Massachusetts, Michigan, Minnesota, Missouri, Montana, Nevada, New Jersey, New Mexico, New York, Ohio, Oregon, Rhode Island, Vermont, Virginia, and Washington), Guam, the Northern Mariana Islands, the U.S. Virgin Islands, and the District of Columbia have legalized recreational use of cannabis, with all but Virginia and D.C. having legalized its commercial sale. Another 7 states are considered to have decriminalization policies in effect.

In 1996, California became the first state to legalize the medical use of cannabis when voters approved Proposition 215. As of March 2023, thirty-eight states, four out of five permanently inhabited U.S. territories, and the District of Columbia have legalized medical cannabis. Ten other states have more restrictive laws limiting THC content, for the purpose of allowing access to products that are rich in cannabidiol (CBD), a non-psychoactive component of cannabis. In 2024 thirty-seven states including District of Columbia have legalized the use of medical marijuana and CBD including recreational use as well.

It was reported that in 2023 the states with marijuana legalized for personal consumption purposes generated around 4.2 billion in annual tax revenue. However this income does not include city takings or the proceeds that are taken to be distributed to smaller administrative divisions. This means that the number 4.2 billion was actually quite higher to begin with.

==== State and territory laws ====
Legality of cannabis in the United States Legal for recreational use Legal for medical use No comprehensive medical program ● Decriminalized Notes: · Reflects laws of states and territories, including laws which have not yet gone into effect. Does not reflect federal, tribal, or local laws. · Map does not show state legality of hemp-derived cannabinoids such as CBD or delta-8-THC, which have been legal at federal level since enactment of the 2018 Farm Bill.

- Alabama
- Alaska
- Arizona
- Arkansas
- California
- Colorado
- Connecticut
- Delaware
- Florida
- Georgia
- Hawaii
- Idaho
- Illinois
- Indiana
- Iowa
- Kansas
- Kentucky
- Louisiana
- Maine
- Maryland
- Massachusetts
- Michigan
- Minnesota
- Mississippi
- Missouri
- Montana
- Nebraska
- Nevada
- New Hampshire
- New Jersey
- New Mexico
- New York
- North Carolina
- North Dakota
- Ohio
- Oklahoma
- Oregon
- Pennsylvania
- Rhode Island
- South Carolina
- South Dakota
- Tennessee
- Texas
- Utah
- Vermont
- Virginia
- Washington
- West Virginia
- Wisconsin
- Wyoming

- American Indian Nations
- American Samoa
- District of Columbia
- Guam
- Northern Mariana Islands
- Puerto Rico
- U.S. Virgin Islands

== Research ==
Prior to 2021, the National Center for Natural Products Research in Oxford, Mississippi was the only facility in the U.S. that was federally licensed by the Drug Enforcement Administration to cultivate cannabis for scientific research. The facility is part of the School of Pharmacy at the University of Mississippi, and cultivates cannabis through a contract with the National Institute on Drug Abuse, to which it provides the cannabis.

Cannabis research has been hindered by the monopoly held by the National Institute on Drug Abuse that existed prior to 2021. The cannabis supplied by NIDA has been criticized by researchers for a variety of reasons, including high amounts of stems and seeds, high mold and yeast levels, low THC content, and low diversity of strains available. NIDA has also been criticized for the length of time in which it responds to proposals, and for favoring research on the harms caused by cannabis over research on the health benefits of cannabis. In August 2016 the DEA announced intention to issue additional cultivation licenses, however, and in 2021 the first licenses were granted.

Research conducted on cannabis also requires licensing from the DEA (specific to Schedule I drugs), and approval from the FDA as well. Prior to 2015, research also required approval from the U.S. Public Health Service, but this requirement was eliminated to make it less difficult for cannabis research to be approved. Numerous medical organizations in the U.S. have called for restrictions on cannabis research to be further eased, including the American Academy of Family Physicians, American Psychological Association, American Cancer Society, American Academy of Pediatrics, and the American Nurses Association.

== Crime ==
Chart from the United States Bureau of Justice Statistics

The great majority of cannabis arrests are for possession. However, in 1997, the vast majority of inmates in state prisons for marijuana-related convictions were convicted of offenses other than simple possession.

According to the Federal Bureau of Investigation's annual Uniform Crime Report, there have been over twelve million cannabis arrests in the U.S. since 1996, including 749,825 persons for marijuana violations in 2012. Of those charged with marijuana violations in 2012, 658,231 (88%) were charged with possession only. The remaining 91,593 individuals were charged with "sale/manufacture", a category that does not differentiate for cultivation offenses, even those where the marijuana was being grown for personal or medical use. Marijuana arrests comprise almost one-half (48.3%) of all drug arrests reported in the U.S. According to the American Civil Liberties Union, there were 8.2 million marijuana arrests from 2001 to 2010, and 88% of those arrests were just for having marijuana with them.

=== Racial disparity in marijuana arrests ===
In a study done by the American Civil Liberties Union, from 2001 to 2010 Black and white people use marijuana at about the same rate. Nationwide, Black people are 3.6 times more likely than white people to be arrested for marijuana, despite similar usage rates. Racial disparities vary in severity among states. For example, Colorado has the lowest disparity with Black people being 1.5 more likely than whites to be arrested for marijuana. On the other hand, in Montana, Kentucky, Illinois, West Virginia and Iowa, Black people are more than seven times more likely to be arrested for marijuana than white people. Nonetheless, in all states whether marijuana is legalized, decriminalized or illegal, Black people still are more likely of going to prison on marijuana charges, proving that legalizing or decriminalizing marijuana alone will not change the disparity.

Racial profiling among law enforcement is to blame for these disparities. Law enforcement often targets people on their actual and perceived race instead of having reasonable suspicion for a crime. Minor offense like possession of marijuana are strictly enforced in racial communities, while the same offenses are often ignored in white affluent communities. This racial profiling results in the mass incarceration of Black, Hispanic and Latino individuals.

== Political support ==
The Libertarian Party and the Green Party are known for advocating for the legalization of marijuana. There are also active cannabis political parties in at least five states. These include the Grassroots–Legalize Cannabis Party, the Legal Marijuana Now Party, the Legalize Marijuana Party, and the U.S. Marijuana Party.

=== History of cannabis political parties in the U.S. ===
- The Youth International Party, formed in 1967 to advance the counterculture of the 1960s, often ran candidates for public office. The Yippie flag is a five-pointed star superimposed with a cannabis leaf.
- The Grassroots Party was founded in Minnesota in 1986 and ran numerous candidates for state and federal offices. The party was active in Iowa, Minnesota, and Vermont. Grassroots Party ran candidates in every presidential election from 1988 to 2000.
- The Legal Marijuana Now Party was established in Minnesota in 1998.
- In 1998, an independent candidate, Edward Forchion, ran for Congress from New Jersey as the Legalize Marijuana Party candidate. Since then, Forchion has run several times for a number of offices, under that banner.
- The Marijuana Reform Party was established in New York, in 1998, and ran gubernatorial candidates there in both 1998 and 2002.
- The U.S. Marijuana Party is an organization that promotes electoral involvement by marijuana legalization supporters. In 2012, the group endorsed Libertarian Gary Johnson for President.
- The Anti-prohibition Party ran candidates for office in New York State for one election cycle in 2010.
- In 2010 and 2012, independent candidate Cris Ericson was on the ballot for multiple offices in Vermont under the label of U.S. Marijuana.
- The Grassroots–Legalize Cannabis Party was founded in Minnesota, in 2014.
- In 2016, the Legal Marijuana Now Party placed their presidential candidates onto the ballot in two states.

In July 2016, delegates at the 2016 Democratic National Convention voted to approve a party platform calling for cannabis to be removed from the list of Schedule I substances, as well as calling for a "reasoned pathway for future legalization".

== Polling ==
Gallup began polling the public as to the issue of legalizing cannabis in 1969; in that year 12% were in favor. Since then, support for legalization has gradually increased. The 2017 Gallup poll showed a record high of 64% in favor of legalizing cannabis. In 2018, the same poll increased to an all-new high of 68%, showing that the great majority of Americans favored legalizing recreational marijuana. Polling shows greater support for marijuana when the "medical" label is used.

According to a 2013 survey by Pew Research Center, a majority of Americans favored complete or partial legalization of cannabis. The survey showed 52% of respondents supported cannabis legalization and 45% did not. College graduates' support increased from 39% to 52% in just three years, the support of self-identified conservative Republicans (a group not traditionally supportive of cannabis legalization) had increased to nearly 30%, and bipartisan support had increased across the board. The 2018 version of the poll showed public support had increased to 61%.

Democrats and independents have been more supportive of cannabis legalization in the 21st century. In Gallup polling, majorities of Democrats and independents expressed support for legalization in the early 2010s while a majority of Republicans supported legalization in 2017. Since 2023, support among Republicans for legalization has plummeted to 40%.

Attitudes regarding marijuana regulation changed as some states (Colorado, Washington, Oregon, Maine, and Alaska) passed their own laws legalizing marijuana for recreational use. According to a Gallup Poll published in December 2012, 64% of Americans believe the federal government should not intervene in these states.

A 2018 study in Social Science Research found that the main determinants of these changes in attitudes toward marijuana regulation since the 1990s were a decline in perception of the riskiness of marijuana, changes in media framing of marijuana, a decline in overall punitiveness, and a decrease in religious affiliation.

In 2018, reflecting the increased growth of support for cannabis legalization, Gallup's annual poll showed that 66% of Americans supported legalization, including 78% of people aged 18 to 34, 75% of Democrats, 71% of Independents, 65% of people aged 35 to 54, 59% of people over 55, 53% of Republicans, and at least 65% support in the East, South, Midwest, and West.

Cannabis legalization polled as very popular in 2019 according to three major national polls.

In 2023, a Gallup poll indicated that 70% of adults in the United States support the legalization of cannabis.

== See also ==
- Adult lifetime cannabis use by country
- Annual cannabis use by country
- Cannabis dispensaries in the United States
- Cannabis political parties
- Cannabis: The Illegalization of Weed in America
- Legality of cannabis by country
- Legality of cannabis by U.S. jurisdiction
- List of United States politicians who admit to cannabis use
- Minors and the legality of cannabis
- SAFE Banking Act
- Smoke and Mirrors: The War on Drugs and the Politics of Failure

=== Advocacy ===
- Americans for Safe Access
- Law Enforcement Against Prohibition
- Marijuana Policy Project
- National Organization for the Reform of Marijuana Laws
- National Cannabis Industry Association
