= Removal of cannabis from Schedule I of the Controlled Substances Act =

Proposed changes to the legal status of cannabis in U.S. federal law

In the United States, the removal of cannabis from Schedule I of the Controlled Substances Act, the category reserved for drugs that have "no currently accepted medical use", is a legal and administrative change in cannabis-related law at the federal level. After being proposed repeatedly since 1972, the U.S. Department of Justice initiated 2024 rulemaking to reschedule cannabis to Schedule III of the Controlled Substances Act, which was subject to a December 2025 executive order directing that process be completed. The acting U.S. Attorney General reclassified state-regulated medical cannabis to Schedule III in April 2026.

== Background ==
Schedule I is the only category of controlled substances not allowed to be prescribed by a physician. Under 21 U.S.C. § 812, drugs must meet three criteria in order to be placed in Schedule I:

1. The drug or other substance has a high potential for abuse.
2. The drug or other substance has no currently accepted medical use in treatment in the United States.
3. There is a lack of accepted safety for the use of the drug or other substances under medical supervision.

In 1970, Congress placed cannabis into Schedule I on the advice of Assistant Secretary of Health Roger O. Egeberg. His letter to Harley O. Staggers, Chairman of the House Committee on Interstate and Foreign Commerce, indicates that the classification was intended to be provisional:

Dear Mr. Chairman: In a prior communication, comments requested by your committee on the scientific aspects of the drug classification scheme incorporated in H.R. 18583 were provided. This communication is concerned with the proposed classification of marijuana.

It is presently classed in schedule I(C) along with its active constituents, the tetrahydrocannibinols and other psychotropic drugs.

Some question has been raised whether the use of the plant itself produces "severe psychological or physical dependence" as required by a schedule I or even schedule II criterion. Since there is still a considerable void in our knowledge of the plant and the effects of the active drug contained in it, our recommendation is that marijuana be retained within schedule I at least until the completion of certain studies now underway to resolve the issue.

In 1972, the National Commission on Marijuana and Drug Abuse released a report favoring decriminalization of cannabis. Congress and the Nixon administration took no action to implement the recommendation, however.

Rescheduling proponents argue that cannabis does not meet the Controlled Substances Act's strict criteria for placement in Schedule I and so the government is required by law to permit medical use or to remove the drug from federal control altogether. The US government, on the other hand, until the August 2023 HHS determination to the contrary, maintained that cannabis is dangerous enough to merit Schedule I status. The dispute was based on differing views on both how the Act should be interpreted and what kinds of scientific evidence are most relevant to the rescheduling decision.

The Act provides a process for rescheduling controlled substances by petitioning the Drug Enforcement Administration. The first petition under this process was filed in 1972 to allow cannabis to be legally prescribed by physicians. The petition was ultimately denied after 22 years of court challenges, but a synthetic pill form of cannabis's psychoactive ingredient, THC, was rescheduled in 1986 to allow prescription under schedule II. In 1999, it was again rescheduled to allow prescription under schedule III.

At the time of federal rescheduling in April 2026, according to the Department of Justice, 40 U.S. states had legalized the use of medical marijuana.

Advocates of marijuana legalization argued that the budgetary impact of removing cannabis from Schedule I of the Controlled Substances Act and legalizing its use in the United States would save billions by reducing government spending for prohibition enforcement in the criminal justice system. Additionally, they argued that billions in annual tax revenues could be generated through proposed taxation and regulation.

== Arguments for and against ==
=== For rescheduling ===
Jon Gettman, former director of the National Organization for the Reform of Marijuana Laws, has argued that cannabis does not fit each of the three statutory criteria for Schedule I. Gettman believes that "high potential for abuse" means that a drug has a potential for abuse similar to that of heroin or cocaine. Gettman argues further that since laboratory animals do not self-administer cannabis, and because cannabis' toxicity is virtually non-existent compared to that of heroin or cocaine, cannabis lacks the high abuse potential required for inclusion in Schedule I or II.

Gettman also states: "The acceptance of cannabis' medical use by eight [now thirty-eight and DC] states since 1996 and the experiences of patients, doctors, and state officials in these states establish marijuana's accepted medical use in the United States." Specifically, Alabama, Alaska, Arizona, Arkansas, California, Colorado, Connecticut, Delaware, Florida, Georgia, Hawaii, Illinois, Iowa, Kentucky, Louisiana, Maine, Maryland, Massachusetts, Michigan, Minnesota, Mississippi, Missouri, Montana, New Hampshire, Nevada, New Jersey, New Mexico, New York, North Dakota, Ohio, Oklahoma, Oregon, Pennsylvania, Puerto Rico, Rhode Island, South Dakota, Tennessee, Utah, Vermont, Virginia, Washington, Washington DC, and West Virginia, have enacted legislation allowing the medical use of cannabis by their citizens. A minimum of 4 million patients are currently using medical cannabis legally in these states.

In his petition, Gettman also argues that cannabis is an acceptably safe medication. He notes that a 1999 Institute of Medicine report found that "except for the harms associated with smoking, the adverse effects of marijuana use are within the range of effects tolerated for other medications." He points out that there are a number of delivery routes that were not considered by the institute, such as transdermal, sublingual, and rectal administration, in addition to vaporizers, which release cannabis' active ingredients into the air without burning the plant matter.

A study published in the March 1, 1990 issue of the Proceedings of the National Academy of Sciences stated that "there are virtually no reports of fatal cannabis overdose in humans" and attributed this safety to the low density of cannabinoid receptors in areas of the brain controlling breathing and the heart. Gettman claims that the discovery of the cannabinoid receptor system in the late 1980s revolutionized scientific understanding of cannabis' effects and provided further evidence that it does not belong in Schedule I.

In 2003, the United States government patented cannabinoids, including those in marijuana that cause users to get "high" (such as THC) based on these chemicals' prevention of trauma- and age-related brain damage.

In January 2008, the American College of Physicians called for a review of cannabis's Schedule I classification in its position paper titled "Supporting Research into the Therapeutic Role of Marijuana" It stated therein: "Position 4: ACP urges an evidence-based review of marijuana's status as a Schedule I controlled substance to determine whether it should be reclassified to a different schedule. This review should consider the scientific findings regarding marijuana's safety and efficacy in some clinical conditions as well as evidence on the health risks associated with marijuana consumption, particularly in its crude smoked form."

From 2008 to 2012, the American Patients Rights Association, in cooperation with Medical Marijuana expert Kim Quiggle, lobbied the federal government over what is now known as the "Mary Lou Eimer Criteria" based on a medical study performed by Quiggle on over 10,000 chronically ill and terminally ill patients' use of medical marijuana in Southern California. This study provided conclusive evidence that medical marijuana provided a safer and alternative application to many current pharmaceutical products available for patients, especially those with cancer and HIV/AIDS. The "Mary Lou Eimer Criteria" were instrumental in the issuance of the Cole Memorandum, which has set federal guidelines over states with medical marijuana laws and has urged the federal government to reschedule marijuana to a Class IV or Class V controlled substance based on the results of the Quiggle Study.

=== Against rescheduling ===
In 1992, DEA Administrator Robert Bonner promulgated five criteria, based somewhat on the Controlled Substances Act's legislative history, for determining whether a drug has an accepted medical use. The DEA claims that cannabis has no accepted medical use because it does not meet all of these criteria:

- The drug's chemistry is known and reproducible;
- There are adequate safety studies;
- There are adequate and well-controlled studies proving efficacy;
- The drug is accepted by qualified experts; and
- The scientific evidence is widely available.

These criteria are not binding; they were created by DEA and may be altered at any time. Judicial deference to agency decisions is what has kept them in effect, despite the difference between these and the statutory criteria. Cannabis is one of several plants with unproven abuse potential and toxicity that Congress placed in Schedule I. The DEA interprets the Controlled Substances Act to mean that if a drug with even a low potential for abuse — say, equivalent to a Schedule V drug — has no accepted medical use, then it must remain in Schedule I:

When it comes to a drug that is currently listed in Schedule I, if it is undisputed that such drug has no currently accepted medical use in treatment in the United States and a lack of accepted safety for use under medical supervision, and it is further undisputed that the drug has at least some potential for abuse sufficient to warrant control under the CSA, the drug must remain in schedule I. In such circumstances, placement of the drug in schedules II through V would conflict with the CSA since such drug would not meet the criterion of "a currently accepted medical use in treatment in the United States." 21 USC 812(b). Therefore, even if one were to assume, theoretically, that your assertions about marijuana's potential for abuse were correct (i.e., that marijuana had some potential for abuse but less than the "high potential for abuse" commensurate with schedules I and II), marijuana would not meet the criteria for placement in schedules III through V since it has no currently accepted medical use in treatment in the United States—a determination that is reaffirmed by HHS in the attached medical and scientific evaluation.

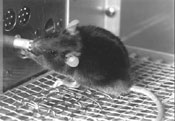
The U.S. Government argues that human studies are more relevant than studies showing animals do not self-administer cannabis.

The Department of Health and Human Services rejects the argument that laboratory animals' failure to self-administer cannabis is conclusive proof of its low potential for abuse:

The Secretary disagrees with Mr. Gettman's assertion that "[t]he accepted contemporary legal convention for evaluating the abuse potential of a drug or substance is the relative degree of self-administration the drug induces in animal subjects." As discussed above, self-administration tests that identify whether a substance is reinforcing in animals are but one component of the scientific assessment of the abuse potential of a substance. Positive indicators of human abuse liability for a particular substance, whether from laboratory studies or epidemiological data, are given greater weight than animal studies suggesting the same compound has no abuse potential.

The Food and Drug Administration elaborates on this, arguing that the widespread use of cannabis, and the existence of some heavy users, is evidence of its "high potential for abuse," despite the drug's lack of physiological addictiveness:

[P]hysical dependence and toxicity are not the only factors to consider in determining a substance's abuse potential. A large number of individuals using marijuana on a regular basis and the vast amount of marijuana that is available for illicit use are indicative of widespread use. In addition, there is evidence that marijuana use can result in psychological dependence in a certain proportion of the population.

The Department of Justice (DOJ) also considers the fact that people are willing to risk scholastic, career, and legal problems to use cannabis to be evidence of its high potential for abuse:

Throughout his petition, Mr. Gettman argues that while many people "use" cannabis, few "abuse" it. He appears to equate abuse with the level of physical dependence and toxicity resulting from cannabis use. Thus, he appears to be arguing that a substance that causes only low levels of physical dependence and toxicity must be considered to have a low potential for abuse. The Secretary does not agree with this argument. Physical dependence and toxicity are not the only factors that are considered in determining a substance's abuse potential. The actual use and frequency of use of a substance, especially when that use may result in harmful consequences such as failure to fulfill major obligations at work or school, physical risk-taking, or even substance-related legal problems, are indicative of a substance's abuse potential.

== Process ==
Cannabis could be rescheduled either legislatively, through Congress, or through the executive branch. Congress has so far rejected all bills to reschedule cannabis. However, it is not unheard of for Congress to intervene in the drug scheduling process; in February 2000, for instance, the 105th Congress, in its second official session, passed Public Law 106-172, also known as the Hillory J. Farias and Samantha Reed Date-Rape Drug Prohibition Act of 2000, adding GHB to Schedule I. On June 23, 2011, Rep. Barney Frank and Rep. Ron Paul introduced H.R. 2306, legislation that would completely remove cannabis from the federal schedules, limiting the federal government's role to policing cross-border or interstate transfers into states where it remains illegal.

The Controlled Substances Act also provides for a rulemaking process by which the United States Attorney General can reschedule cannabis administratively. These proceedings represent the only means of legalizing medical cannabis without an act of Congress. Rescheduling supporters have often cited the lengthy petition review process as a reason why cannabis is still illegal. The first petition took 22 years to review, the second took 7 years, and the third was denied 9 years later. A 2013 petition by two state governors is still pending.

=== Rulemaking proceedings ===
The United States Code, under Section 811 of Title 21, sets out a process by which cannabis could be administratively transferred to a less-restrictive category or removed from Controlled Substances Act regulation altogether. The Drug Enforcement Administration (DEA) evaluates petitions to reschedule cannabis. However, the Controlled Substances Act gives the Department of Health and Human Services (HHS), as the successor agency of the Department of Health, Education, and Welfare, great power over rescheduling decisions.

After the DEA accepts the filing of a petition, the agency must request from the HHS Secretary "a scientific and medical evaluation, and his recommendations, as to whether such drug or other substance should be so controlled or removed as a controlled substance." The Secretary's findings on scientific and medical issues are binding on the DEA. The HHS Secretary can even unilaterally legalize cannabis: "[I]f the Secretary recommends that a drug or other substance not be controlled, the Attorney General shall not control the drug or other substance." 21 U.S.C. § 811(b).

=== Factors ===
Unless an international treaty requires controlling a substance, the attorney general must, in finding whether the drug meets the three criteria for placement in a particular schedule, consider the following factors:

- The drug's actual or relative potential for abuse.
- Scientific evidence of its pharmacological effect, if known.
- The state of current scientific knowledge regarding the drug or other substance.
- Its history and current pattern of abuse.
- The scope, duration, and significance of abuse.
- What, if any, risk there is to the public health.
- Its psychological or physiological dependence liability.
- Whether the substance is an immediate precursor of a controlled substance.

=== International treaty scheduling ===
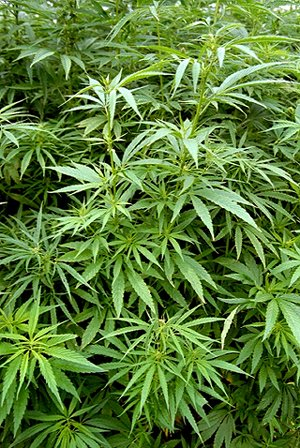
The Single Convention on Narcotic Drugs requires governments to regulate cannabis cultivation, but does not ban medical use.

The Single Convention on Narcotic Drugs, 1961 is the main international treaty establishing international law provisions related to marijuana. It was ratified by the United States in 1967. When a treaty ratified by the U.S. mandates that a drug be controlled, the attorney general is required to "issue an order controlling such drug under the schedule he deems most appropriate to carry out such obligations" without regard to scientific or medical findings, per 21 U.S.C. § 811d. Under the United Nations' Single Convention on Narcotic Drugs, cannabis and cannabis resin were traditionally classified under Schedule IV (treaty's most strictly controlled category of drugs) since 1961.

However, in 2020, world nations voted to lower the scheduling status of marijuana to the less-restrictive Schedule I. The decision became legally effective worldwide in April 2021, taking "cannabis and cannabis resin" out of Schedule IV to leave it only in Schedule I. After "cannabis and cannabis resin" have been removed from Schedule IV, further steps to reschedule or deschedule marijuana (such as taking it out of the treaty's Schedule I) would now require amendment of the treaty. The principal features of the international legal regime of Schedule I are:

- Limitation to medical and scientific purposes of all phases of trade (manufacture, domestic trade, both wholesale and retail, and international trade) in, and of the possession and use of, drugs, except drugs that are used in industry for other than medical and scientific purposes (article 2(9));
- Requirement of governmental authorization (licensing or state ownership) for the participation in any phase of the production or trade, specific import and export authorization for each individual international transaction;
- Obligation of all participants in the trade to keep detailed records of their transactions;
- Requirement of a medical prescription for the supply or dispensation of drugs to individuals;
- A system of limiting the quantities of drugs available, by manufacture or import or both, in each country and territory, to those needed for medical and scientific purposes.

Status of scheduling of cannabis and cannabis resin under the Single Convention on narcotic drugs, 1961
Schedule	Period in effect	Description
IV	1968–2021	Corresponds to drugs that are deemed to be particularly liable to abuse and to produce ill effects, and such liability is not offset by substantial therapeutic advantages – article 3(5)
I	2021–present	"Constitute the standard regime under the Single Convention" corresponding to drugs deemed liable to abuse and productive of ill-effects – article 3(3)

In the United States, 21 U.S.C. § 811(d)(2)(B) of the Controlled Substances Act states that if the United Nations Commission on Narcotic Drugs proposes rescheduling a drug, the HHS Secretary "shall evaluate the proposal and furnish a recommendation to the Secretary of State which shall be binding on the representative of the United States in discussions and negotiations relating to the proposal".

However, "[s]cheduling pursuant to international treaty obligations does not require the factual findings that are necessary for other administrative scheduling actions, and may be implemented without regard to the procedures outlined for regular administrative scheduling." For this reason, some have argued that changes in cannabis scheduling at the U.S. federal level may be fast-tracked after the change in treaty scheduling, on these grounds.

== History ==
=== 1970–1994 ===
In 1972, the National Organization for the Reform of Marijuana Laws (NORML) petitioned the Bureau of Narcotics and Dangerous Drugs (BNDD) (now the Drug Enforcement Administration (DEA)) to transfer cannabis to Schedule II so that it could be legally prescribed by physicians. The BNDD declined to initiate proceedings on the basis of their interpretation of U.S. treaty commitments.

In 1974, the United States Court of Appeals for the District of Columbia Circuit ruled against the government and ordered them to process the petition (NORML v. Ingersoll 497 F.2d 654). The government continued to rely on treaty commitments in their interpretation of scheduling-related issues concerning the NORML petition. In 1977, the Court issued a decision clarifying that the Controlled Substances Act requires a full scientific and medical evaluation and the fulfillment of the rescheduling process before treaty commitments can be evaluated (NORML v. DEA 559 F.2d 735). On October 16, 1980, the Court ordered the government to start the scientific and medical evaluations required by the NORML petition (NORML v. DEA Unpublished Disposition, U.S. App. LEXIS 13100).

Meanwhile, some members of Congress were taking action to reschedule the drug legislatively. Representative Steve Neal (D-NC), serving as head of the Task Force on Marihuana, conducted hearings in May 1980. Rep. Stuart McKinney introduced a bill to transfer cannabis to Schedule II in 1981, cosponsored by a bipartisan coalition of 84 House members, including prominent Republicans Newt Gingrich (GA), Bill McCollum (FL), John Porter (IL), and Frank Wolf (VA). After the bill died in committee, Rep. Barney Frank began annually introducing nearly identical legislation. All of Frank's bills have suffered the same fate, though, without attracting more than a handful of co-sponsors.

On October 18, 1985, the DEA issued a Notice of Proposed Rulemaking to transfer "Synthetic Dronabinol in Sesame Oil and Encapsulated in Soft Gelatin Capsules" — a pill form of Δ^{9}-tetrahydrocannabinol, the main psychoactive component of cannabis, sold under the brand name Marinol — from Schedule I to Schedule II (DEA 50 FR 42186-87). The government issued its final rule rescheduling the drug on July 13, 1986 (DEA 51 FR 17476-78). The disparate treatment of cannabis and the expensive, patentable Marinol prompted reformers to question the DEA's consistency.

In the summer of 1986, the DEA administrator initiated public hearings on cannabis rescheduling. The hearings lasted two years, involving many witnesses and thousands of pages of documentation. On September 6, 1988, DEA Chief Administrative Law Judge Francis L. Young ruled that cannabis did not meet the legal criteria of a Schedule I prohibited drug and should be reclassified. He declared that cannabis in its natural form is "one of the safest therapeutically active substances known to man. (T)he provisions of the (Controlled Substances) Act permit and require the transfer of marijuana from Schedule I to Schedule II".

Then-DEA Administrator John Lawn overruled Young's determination. Lawn said he decided against rescheduling cannabis based on testimony and comments from numerous medical doctors who had conducted detailed research and were widely considered experts in their respective fields. Later Administrators agreed. "Those who insist that marijuana has medical uses would serve society better by promoting or sponsoring more legitimate research," former DEA Administrator Robert Bonner opined in 1992. This statement was quoted by the Multidisciplinary Association for Psychedelic Studies (MAPS) in its membership drives.

In 1994, the D.C. Court of Appeals finally affirmed the DEA Administrator's power to overrule Judge Young's decision (Alliance for Cannabis Therapeutics v. DEA. 15 F.3d 1131). The petition was officially dead. "Each of the doctors testifying on behalf of NORML claimed that his opinion was based on scientific studies, yet with one exception, none could identify, under oath, the scientific studies they relied on," DEA Administrator Thomas A. Constantine remarked in 1995.

=== 1995 petition ===
On July 10, 1995, Jon Gettman and High Times magazine filed another rescheduling petition with the DEA. This time, instead of focusing on cannabis' medical uses, the petitioners claimed that cannabis did not have the "high potential for abuse" required for Schedule I or Schedule II status. They based their claims on studies of the brain's cannabinoid receptor system conducted by the National Institute of Mental Health (NIMH) between 1988 and 1994. In particular, they claim that a 1992 study by M. Herkenham et al., "using a lesion-technique, established that there are no cannabinoid receptors in the dopamine-producing areas of the brain". Other studies, summarized in Gettman's 1997 report Dopamine and the Dependence Liability of Marijuana, showed that cannabis has only an indirect effect on dopamine transmission. This suggested that cannabis' psychoactive effects are produced by a different mechanism than addictive drugs such as amphetamine, cocaine, ethanol, nicotine, and opiates. The National Institute on Drug Abuse, however, continued to publish literature denying this finding. For instance, NIDA claims the following in its youth publication The Science Behind Drug Abuse:

A chemical in marijuana, THC, triggers brain cells to release the chemical dopamine. Dopamine creates good feelings — for a short time. Here's the thing: Once dopamine starts flowing, a user feels the urge to smoke marijuana again, and then again, and then again. Repeated use could lead to addiction, and addiction is a brain disease.

In January 1997, the White House Office of National Drug Control Policy (ONDCP) asked the Institute of Medicine (IOM) to conduct a review of the scientific evidence to assess the potential health benefits and risks of cannabis and its constituent cannabinoids. In 1999, the IOM recommended that medical cannabis use be allowed for certain patients in the short term, and that preparations of isolated cannabinoids be developed as a safer alternative to smoked cannabis. The IOM also found that the gateway drug theory was "beyond the issues normally considered for medical uses of drugs and should not be a factor in evaluating the therapeutic potential of marijuana or cannabinoids."

Both sides claimed that the IOM report supported their position. The DEA publication Exposing the Myth of Smoked Medical Marijuana interpreted the IOM's statement, "While we see a future in the development of chemically defined cannabinoid drugs, we see little future in smoked marijuana as a medicine," as meaning that smoking cannabis is not recommended for the treatment of any disease condition. Cannabis advocates pointed out that the IOM did not study vaporizers, devices which, by heating cannabis to 185 °C, release therapeutic cannabinoids while reducing or eliminating ingestion of various carcinogens.

On July 2, 1999, Marinol was again rescheduled, this time from Schedule II to the even less-restrictive Schedule III, while cannabis remained in Schedule I (64 FR 35928). The petitioners argued that the distinction between the two drugs was arbitrary, and that cannabis should be rescheduled as well. The DEA, however, continued to support Marinol as a method of THC ingestion without harmful smoke inhalation.

The DEA published a final denial of Gettman's petition on April 18, 2001. The U.S. Court of Appeals for the D.C. Circuit upheld the agency's decision on May 24, 2002, ruling that the petitioners were not sufficiently injured to have standing to challenge DEA's determinations in federal court (290 F.3d 430). Since the appeal was dismissed on a technicality, it is unknown what position the Court would have taken on the merits of the case.

=== 2002 petition ===
The Coalition for Rescheduling Cannabis filed a new petition for rescheduling on October 9, 2002. The new organization consisted of medical cannabis patients and other petitioners who would be more directly affected by the DEA's decision. On April 3, 2003, the DEA accepted the filing of that petition. According to Jon Gettman, "In accepting the petition the DEA has acknowledged that the Coalition has established a legally significant argument in support of the recognition of the accepted medical use of cannabis in the United States."

(In a 2005 footnote to the majority decision in Gonzales v. Raich, Justice John Paul Stevens said that if the scientific evidence offered by medical cannabis supporters is true, it would "cast serious doubt" on the Schedule I classification.)

After nine years of delay, on May 23, 2011, the Coalition filed suit in the District of Columbia Circuit Court of Appeals to compel the DEA to formally respond to its 2002 rescheduling petition. The writ of mandamus request alleged that the lack of decision by DEA, "presents a paradigmatic example of unreasonable delay under Telecommunications Research & Action Ctr. v. FCC." After DEA responded by denying the rescheduling petition, the mandamus request was dismissed as moot by the D.C. Circuit Court of Appeals on October 14, 2011.

The DEA denied the Petition for Rescheduling on July 8, 2011.

In response to the petition's denial, medical cannabis advocacy group Americans for Safe Access appealed to the D.C. Circuit on January 23, 2012. Oral arguments in the case Americans for Safe Access v. DEA were heard on October 16, 2012. On the same day the case was heard, the court ordered the plaintiffs (ASA) to clarify their arguments on standing. In response, ASA filed a supplemental brief on October 22, 2012, detailing how plaintiff Michael Krawitz was harmed by the federal government's policy on medical marijuana due to being denied treatment by the Department of Veterans Affairs. A ruling that acknowledged Krawitz's standing, but ultimately stood by the DEA was made on January 22, 2013.

=== 2009–2011 ===
On December 17, 2009, Rev. Bryan A. Krumm, CNP, filed a rescheduling petition for Cannabis with the DEA arguing that "because marijuana does not have the abuse potential for placement in Schedule I of the CSA, and because marijuana now has accepted medical use in 13 states, and because the DEA's own Administrative Law Judge has already determined that marijuana is safe for use under medical supervision, the federal definition for a schedule I controlled substance, 21 U.S.C. § 812(b)(1)(A)-(C), no longer applies to marijuana and federal law must be amended to reflect these changes." Krumm demanded an expedited ruling in order to protect his health and welfare, as well as that of all citizens of the United States who may benefit from this safe and effective medication.

Rev. Krumm did not request that cannabis be moved to any specific schedule of control under the Controlled Substances Act (CSA) and has reserved his right to challenge any incorrect findings by the FDA and/or DEA whether Cannabis should even be regulated under the CSA. DEA denied Rev. Krumm's petition on July 19, 2016 and published the denial in the Federal Register on August 12, 2016.

On November 30, 2011, Washington State Governor Christine Gregoire announced filing a petition with the U.S. Drug Enforcement Administration asking the agency to reclassify marijuana as a Schedule 2 drug, which will allow its use for treatment – prescribed by doctors and filled by pharmacists. Gov. Lincoln Chafee (I-Rhode Island) also signed the petition. The FDA withheld any recommendation to the DEA regarding both the 2009 and 2011 petitions until December 2015. DEA ultimately denied the governors' petition on August 12, 2016.

On June 23, 2011, Rep. Barney Frank (D-MA), along with 1 Republican and 19 Democratic cosponsors, introduced the Ending Federal Marijuana Prohibition Act of 2011, which would have removed marijuana and THC from the list of Schedule I controlled substances and would have provided that the Controlled Substances Act not apply to marijuana except when transported to a jurisdiction where its use is illegal. The bill was referred to committee but died when no further action was taken.

=== 2012–2017 ===
On November 27, 2012, after voters in the states of Colorado and Washington voted to legalize recreational use of marijuana, Rep. Diana DeGette (D-CO) introduced a bill referred to as the 'Respect States and Citizens Rights Act' which aimed to amend the Controlled Substances Act to exclude any state that has legalized marijuana (for medical OR recreational use) from marijuana provisions of the CSA, effectively giving state law precedence over federal law in cases where an individual (or commercial enterprise) is acting within the letter of state law regarding marijuana/cannabis. The bill was referred to committee but died when no further action was taken. The same bill was reintroduced later in the 113th and 114th Congresses, where it died each time.

At a congressional hearing in June 2014, the deputy director for Regulatory Programs at the FDA said the agency was conducting an analysis on whether marijuana should be downgraded, at the request of the DEA.

On February 20, 2015, Rep. Jared Polis (D-CO), along with 1 Republican and 18 Democratic cosponsors, introduced the Regulate Marijuana Like Alcohol Act, which would have, among other provisions, directed the Attorney General to remove marijuana from all schedules of controlled substances under the Controlled Substances Act; prohibited transport of marijuana into a jurisdiction in which its possession, use, or sale is prohibited; and granted the Food and Drug Administration the same authorities with respect to marijuana as it has for alcohol. The bill was referred to committee but died when no further action was taken.

In August 2016 the DEA reaffirmed its position and refused to remove Schedule I classification. However, the DEA announced that it would end restrictions on the supply of marijuana to researchers and drug companies that had previously only been available from the government's own facility at the University of Mississippi.

The 2016 platform of the Democratic Party called for removal of marijuana from Schedule I of the Controlled Substances Act, "providing a reasoned pathway for future legalization" of marijuana. This language was approved in a close vote (81–80 vote) in the platform committee.

In February 2017, Morgan Griffith, a Virginia Republican, introduced H.R. 714, Legitimate Use of Medicinal Marijuana Act, that would move cannabis to Schedule II. Griffith had introduced a bill under the same name in 2014.

In April 2017, Matt Gaetz, a Florida Republican, cosponsored House Resolution 2020 to move cannabis to Schedule III.

In May 2017, following a resolution adopted at the 2016 annual convention to support cannabis to treat veterans with posttraumatic stress disorder (PTSD), the American Legion petitioned the White House for a meeting to discuss rescheduling or descheduling cannabis and allowing it to be used medically.

In July 2017, a lawsuit was brought in U.S. District Court against the heads of the DEA and Justice Department on the grounds that Schedule I listing of cannabis is "so irrational that it violates the U.S. Constitution". This lawsuit was dismissed by Judge Alvin K. Hellerstein who ruled that the DEA has authority and before bringing the lawsuit the plaintiffs were required to exhaust administrative remedies including petitioning the DEA to reschedule cannabis.

=== 2018–2019 ===
The 2018 United States farm bill descheduled some cannabis products from the Controlled Substances Act for the first time.

In May 2019, a federal appeals court reinstated a case against the federal government over the Schedule I status of cannabis.

The challengers, Super Bowl champion Marvin Washington; Dean Bortell (parent of underage medical cannabis patient Alexis Bortell); U.S. Army veteran José Belén; Sebastien Cotte (parent of underage medical cannabis patient Jagger Cotte); and the Cannabis Cultural Association, originally sued the U.S. federal government, the Drug Enforcement Administration (DEA) and its administrator, and then Attorney General Jeff Sessions, back in 2017. They argued that Schedule I status under the Controlled Substances Act (CSA) represented a risk to patients' health and perpetuated economic inequities in the U.S.

Initially dismissed by the court under the argument that plaintiffs had not exhausted all administrative channels available – such as advocating for rescheduling in Congress and administrative agencies before pursuit of a judicial remedy – the case was reopened, as mandated by the U.S. Court of Appeals for the Second Circuit. Judges still believe other channels are viable, but have decided to reinstate the case citing health concerns related to the two minors involved.

Michael S. Hiller, representing the plaintiffs, stated that the court directed the DEA and federal government to act on the plaintiffs' de-scheduling petition "with all deliberate speed."

Legislation introduced in 2019 to deschedule cannabis has included the Marijuana Justice Act, the Marijuana Freedom and Opportunity Act, the Regulate Marijuana Like Alcohol Act, the Ending Federal Marijuana Prohibition Act, the Marijuana Revenue and Regulation Act, and the Marijuana Opportunity Reinvestment and Expungement Act.

=== 2020–2023 ===
As of September 16, 2020, nine amicus briefs had been filed in support of the plaintiffs' appeal to the Supreme Court in the Washington v. Barr lawsuit. The plaintiffs seek to declare the criminalization of cannabis unconstitutional, arguing that its status as a Schedule I drug—based on the premise that it has no medicinal use—contradicts the federal government's own apparent recognition of the substance as safe and medicinally effective.

In international law, however, the lowering of cannabis from Schedule IV (the strictest class) to Schedule I (the standard level of control) was voted by the United Nations' Commission on Narcotic Drugs on 2 December 2020. The United States voted in favor of the recommendation.

In Sisley v. DEA lawsuit NO. 20-71433, the Ninth Circuit dismissed a petition that asked the court to review the DEA's denial of a letter that requested the agency reschedule marijuana. Under the CSA, the DEA must begin investigating the rescheduling of a drug after receiving a petition from any interested party, including the manufacturer of a drug, a medical society or association, a pharmacy association, a public interest group concerned with drug abuse, a state or local government agency, or an individual citizen. The petition in question in Sisley v. DEA was a one-page, handwritten letter from Jeramy Bowers and Stephen Zyszkiewicz, sent in January 2020 while they were inmates at California Department of Corrections and Rehabilitation. The DEA responded to the petition with a letter that informed Bowers and Zyszkiewicz that the petition was not in the correct format and denied the request without review. In June 2021, the Ninth Circuit dismissed a petition for judicial review of the letter on behalf of Bowers and Zyszkiewicz, saying that they had not exhausted their bureaucratic remedies by addressing a new petition to the DEA in the correct format.

On 6 October 2022, President Joe Biden instructed U.S. Attorney General Merrick Garland to review the classification schedule of cannabis, during a "Statement on Marijuana Reform." This could result in its removal from Schedule I of the Controlled Substances Act. The Congressional Research Service had issued a report a year earlier noting that the President could "use executive orders to direct DEA, HHS, and FDA to consider administrative descheduling of marijuana".

On August 30, 2023, the Department of Health and Human Services released a redacted letter communicating its determination that marijuana should be moved to Schedule III.

=== 2024–2026 ===
Following a FOIA lawsuit filed by attorney Matt Zorn, the Department of Health and Human Services released an un-redacted copy of the department's descheduling determination letter in January 2024. After reviewing the letter, a legal expert concluded it was "very likely that the DEA will move forward with the rulemaking process to reschedule marijuana", a conclusion also reached by the Congressional Research Service in their report. A dozen members of the U.S. Senate, including the majority leader, signed a letter to the United States Attorney general and the head of the Drug Enforcement Administration expressing their desire that rescheduling be the administration's decision, if not outright descheduling.

Reports circulated in April that the Drug Enforcement Administration would consider rescheduling marijuana as a Schedule III drug, touting the significance of the anticipated policy change. The Justice Department confirmed in May that rescheduling was moving forward under the Administrative Procedure Act, with a notice of proposed rulemaking submitted for publication in the Federal Register. President Biden and Vice President Kamala Harris both released video announcements to X concerning the rescheduling. Biden called his administration's action as a "monumental" move in "reversing long-standing inequities... because of a failed approach to marijuana". In early July, the Republican-led House Appropriations Committee attempted to block the DOJ from using federal funds to reschedule cannabis. The public comment period for the proposed rule change closed with nearly 43,000 comments received, a record for any DEA rule change; most supported descheduling, decriminalizing, or legalizing marijuana at the federal level.

Following a string of delays, a preliminary hearing on December 2 resulted in plans for evidentiary and testimonial proceedings between January and March 2025. Hearings were further postponed after the judge admonished the DEA for "deliberate defiance" regarding evidence for the planned proceedings, which he condemned as an "unprecedented and astonishing" failure to follow court instructions.

==== Executive Order 14370 ====
President Donald Trump told donors in August 2025 that he "was interested" in reclassification, and that a rescheduling announcement was forthcoming "in weeks". Reports suggested the administration would order rescheduling before year's end. Trump issued executive order 14370 on December 18, 2025, directing the Attorney General to expedite reclassification to Schedule III, in order to improve "marijuana-related medical research". Acting United States Attorney General Todd Blanche issued an April 22, 2026, order to reclassify state-licensed medical cannabis to Schedule III, effective upon publication in the Federal Register on April 28. DEA conducted a new set of hearings between June 29 and July 15, 2026.

== State-level reclassification ==
Legality of cannabis in the United States Legal for recreational use Legal for medical use No comprehensive medical program ● Decriminalized Notes: · Reflects laws of states and territories, including laws which have not yet gone into effect. Does not reflect federal, tribal, or local laws. · Map does not show state legality of hemp-derived cannabinoids such as CBD or delta-8-THC, which have been legal at federal level since enactment of the 2018 Farm Bill.

In addition to the federal government's classification, each state maintains a similar classification list and it is possible for these lists to conflict.

=== California ===
Proposition 215, the Compassionate Use Act, is a voter initiative, passed in 1996, that made California the first state to legalize cannabis for medical use. California Senate Bill 420, the Medical Marijuana Program Act, was passed in 2004 with the following purpose: "(1) Clarify the scope of the application of the act and facilitate the prompt identification of qualified patients and their designated primary caregivers in order to avoid unnecessary arrest and prosecution of these individuals and provide needed guidance to law enforcement officers. (2) Promote uniform and consistent application of the act among the counties within the state. (3) Enhance the access of patients and caregivers to medical marijuana through collective, cooperative cultivation projects."

In 2016, the Adult Use of Marijuana Act was voted into law, legalizing recreational consumption for those over 21 in the state. In 2017, Senate Bill 94 was signed by the California Governor integrating the previous state medical marijuana regulations and the adult use regulations of the Adult Use of Marijuana Act (AUMA) (Proposition 64) to create the Medicinal and Adult‐Use Cannabis Regulation and Safety Act (MAUCRSA).

Each municipality is allowed to decide whether to grant business licenses for retail, delivery, growing, edibles, and wholesale. Taxes on legal marijuana keep it out of reach to low-income medical or adult users, creating more demand for the black market. Licenses, when available, are extremely limited and can cost $100,000 sometimes requiring proof of additional capital. Additionally, California has long provided much of the marijuana for the entire United States. These factors have allowed the black market to dominate California marijuana. Social equity programs are in place in some cities, but applicants with drug felonies are often excluded from participation. Those who qualify based on race, income, or history of marijuana offenses are often taken advantage of by larger businesses who can outbid each other and take advantage of applicants and the social equity program itself.

Cannabis and tetrahydrocannabinols remain a Schedule I drug (no medical use) in California and are subject to criminal penalties ranging from misdemeanor or felony probation up to 3 years in prison for maintaining a place for controlled substance sale or use under California Health & Safety Code Section 11366.

=== Colorado ===
On Nov. 6, 2012, after passing Amendment 64, Colorado became one of the first two states to legalize the recreational use of marijuana for individuals over the age of 21.

=== Florida ===
On January 27, 2014, the Florida Supreme Court approved the ballot language for a proposed constitutional amendment allowing the medical use of marijuana, following a successful petition drive. The amendment proposal appeared on Florida's November 2014 general election ballot and received 58% of the vote, below the 60% requirement for adoption. The campaign was notable for opposition funding by casino magnate and Republican Party donor Sheldon Adelson. United for Care, the pro-medical cannabis organization responsible for the initial petition, wrote an updated version for the 2016 general election. The Florida Medical Marijuana Legalization Initiative, also known as Amendment 2, was on the November 8, 2016, ballot in Florida as an initiated constitutional amendment. The amendment was approved by 71.32% of the vote making it the highest percentage win in 2016 of any other state cannabis ballot in the United States.

=== Iowa ===
On Feb. 17, 2010, after reviewing testimony from four public hearings and reading through more than 10,000 pages of submitted material, members of the Iowa Board of Pharmacy unanimously voted to recommend that the Iowa legislature remove marijuana from Schedule I of the Iowa Controlled Substances Act.

=== Minnesota ===
On March 16, 2011, Kurtis W. Hanna and Ed Engelmann petitioned the Minnesota Board of Pharmacy to initiate rule making to remove cannabis from the list of Schedule I substance in Minnesota's version of the Uniform Controlled Substances Act. The board was informed when they denied the petition at their meeting on May 11, 2011, by Kurtis Hanna that he planned on filing for judicial review of the agency's decision. In response, the board voted to petition the state legislature to remove the board's authority to remove substances from Schedule I. At a conference committee for Omnibus Drug Bill HF57 on May 18, 2011, the following sentence was added to the bill, "The Board of Pharmacy may not delete or reschedule a drug that is in Schedule I" and the following sentence of statute was deleted, "the state Board of Pharmacy [...] shall annually, on or before May 1 of each year, conduct a review of the placement of controlled substances in the various schedules." The bill was signed into law by Governor Dayton on May 24, 2011. Kurtis Hanna never filed a lawsuit against the Board of Pharmacy due to the belief that it would be moot.

=== Oregon ===
In June 2010, the Oregon Board of Pharmacy reclassified marijuana from a Schedule I drug to a Schedule II drug. News reports noted that this reclassification made Oregon the "first state in the nation to make marijuana anything less serious than a Schedule I drug."

=== Washington ===
On Nov. 6, 2012, Washington voters passed Initiative 502, making the state one of the first two in the nation to legalize the recreational use of marijuana for individuals over the age of 21.

=== Wisconsin ===
Gary Storck sent a letter to the controlled substances board in August 2011 requesting procedures to file a petition, which was discussed at the September 2011 controlled substances board meeting. The Wisconsin controlled substances board has authority to reschedule cannabis pursuant to the rule-making procedures of chapter 227. Drafters planned to submit a petition to the Controlled Substances Board in early 2012.

In 2018, Wisconsin voters approved non-binding referendums to legalize medical or recreational marijuana.

In 2021, Governor Tony Evers included legal marijuana in his budget proposal. It was removed by Republican-controlled legislature. While possession remains illegal under state law, law enforcement has been lax in recent years. Madison has legalized possession and use in public while the Milwaukee County District Attorney chooses not to prosecute most possession cases. While progress is being made, individuals in Wisconsin are still unsure if they will be allowed to use marijuana in public, have marijuana confiscated, be arrested, fined, or imprisoned for lengthy periods. Because of the demand, marijuana is brought in from illegal grows in legal states.

== See also ==
- Adult lifetime cannabis use by country
- Annual cannabis use by country
- Cannabis rescheduling around the world
- Decriminalization of non-medical marijuana in the United States
- Drug Policy Alliance
- Health issues and the effects of cannabis
- Legal and medical status of cannabis
- Legal history of marijuana in the United States
- Legal issues of cannabis
- Legality of cannabis by country
- Marijuana Policy Project
- Medical cannabis
- National Organization for the Reform of Marijuana Laws (NORML)
- Prohibition in the United States
- Single Convention on Narcotic Drugs
