= Cannabis in South Carolina =

Cannabis in South Carolina is illegal for recreational use. Use of low-THC CBD oil is allowed for certain medical conditions. But THC-A hemp is federally legal, per 2018 farm bill.

== Industrial hemp ==
The cultivation of industrial hemp in South Carolina dates back to at least the 18th century. In 1733, an act was passed in the colony to encourage the growth of hemp for its "useful manufacture to his Majesty's Royal Navy". The cultivation of industrial hemp was greatly limited nationwide as a result of the federal 1937 Marihuana Tax Act.

In 2017, South Carolina re-legalized the growing of industrial hemp, under the auspices of the federal 2014 Farm Bill. The new legislation permits up to 20 cultivators to hold state licenses for 20 acres (8.1 ha) each, expanding to 50 licenses and 50 acres (20 ha) for 2018.

== 2014 legalization of CBD ==
In June 2014, Republican governor Nikki Haley signed into law Senate Bill 1035, "Julian's Law", following a unanimous Senate vote and a 92–5 House vote. The law allows children with severe epilepsy to be treated with CBD oil if recommended by a physician.

== 2026 medical cannabis rescheduling ==
When medical cannabis was removed from Schedule I of the Controlled Substances Act and placed in Schedule III at the federal level in April 2026, existing state laws went into effect that are meant to keep the state schedule aligned with the federal schedule. The South Carolina Controlled Substances Therapeutic Research Act of 1980 requires the South Carolina Department of Public Health to reschedule the substance under its own guidelines. The law may also require the state legislature to create a regulatory scheme to enable legal cannabis delivery.

After rescheduling, state senator Tom Davis stated that "In South Carolina, right now, as we stand, we have just become the 41st state that has a legally authorized medical marijuana program."
