= Marijuana Freedom and Opportunity Act =

The Marijuana Freedom and Opportunity Act is legislation that was introduced in the 115 and 116th U.S. Congresses to remove cannabis from the Controlled Substances Act and to establish a Marijuana Opportunity Trust Fund. The legislation was sponsored by U.S. Senator Chuck Schumer, minority leader at the time, and Representative Hakeem Jeffries.
