= Cannabis in Iowa =

Cannabis in Iowa is illegal for recreational use if classified as marijuana but consumable hemp products including CBD products are legal for consumers to possess and registered retailers to sell. Possession of even small amounts of marijuana is a misdemeanor crime. The state has a medical program for patients with qualifying debilitating medical conditions that allows for the legal sale and possession of no more than 4.5g of THC per patient every 90-day period. Allowed modes of consumption are oral and topical forms including, but not limited to; tablets and tinctures, nebulizable inhalable forms, suppositories, and vaporization.

== Prohibition ==
Amidst an early 20th century trend of limiting the drug, Iowa prohibited cannabis in 1923. Other sources state 1921.

== Decriminalization attempts ==
=== Failed 1970s decriminalization attempts ===
In the 1970s, Iowa introduced decriminalization legislation which failed.

=== 2014 failed decriminalization ===
In early 2014, House File 2313 was proposed, which would have reduced the penalty for possession of under 42.5 grams (1 1/2 oz) to a fine of $300, and possession of under a kilogram. The bill failed to progress before the expiry of a procedural deadline, so it was rejected.

=== 2015 failed deprioritization in Cedar Falls ===
The city of Cedar Falls proposed to deprioritize municipal police enforcement of marijuana offenses for possession under one ounce (28 g). The resolution was voted down in January 2015 by a majority of the city council, with one member stating: "We are a governing body tasked with making laws, not ignoring laws."

== Medical marijuana ==
=== 1979-1981 precedents ===
From late 1979 to mid-1981, Iowa's administrative rules allowed for medical use of marijuana through a therapeutic research center.

=== 2014: Legalization of CBD oil ===
Introduced by a committee, placed on Ways and Means calendar, Senate Bill 2360 on April 23, 2014 passed in the Senate by a vote of 36-12 on April 24, 2014. Bill 2360 was read for the first time in the House, referred to the Public Safety Committee, and passed by a subcommittee on April 25, 2014; Committee reports recommended amendments be made as well as passage; committee amendments were filed on April 29, 2014. Senate Bill 2360 allows the possession or use of cannabidiol that has less than 3% tetrahydrocannabinol for the treatment of intractable epilepsy, through the written recommendation of a neurologist. The bill states that the cannabidiol must be obtained from an out-of-state source and "recommended for oral or transdermal administration", (smoked).

In May 2014, Governor Terry Branstad signed into law the Medical Cannabidiol Act, allowing possession of CBD oil with a neurologist's recommendation for the treatment of intractable epilepsy in children, to go into effect at the end of January 2015. Observers criticized the new law, noting that it contained no provision for legally obtaining CBD oil, as it remains illegal to produce in Iowa or to transport across state lines. A policy advisor for the Iowa Department of Public Health noted: "There are still some very fundamental barriers to parents getting the oil."

=== 2017: Expansion of medical marijuana ===
In May 2017, Branstad signed into law an expanded Medical Cannabidiol Act, which expanded the number for diseases for treatment. These diseases include cancer, chronic pain, multiple sclerosis, HIV/AIDS, Crohn's disease, Parkinson's disease, and more.

=== 2020: Further expansion of medical marijuana ===
On June 29, 2020 Governor of Iowa, Kim Reynolds approved House File 2589. This Act was an update to the existing legislation regarding the medical cannabidiol act and marijuana. The amendments included, but are not limited to further additions to the list of conditions for patients to qualify for medical cannabis and also a change to the maximum amount of THC which may be given to patients, replacing the 3% limit with a cap of 4.5 grams per patient in a 90 day period.

=== 2023: Adult-use Marijuana Legalization ===
On January 12, 2023 Iowa Senate Democrats introduced senate bill SF73 which if passed, would legalize the regulated sale and possession for legal adult residents and non-residents 21 years of age or older of up to an amount not exceeding 30 grams of Marijuana flower, 5 grams of concentrate, and 500 mg of Tetrahydrocannabinol (THC) contained in a product infused with Marijuana. Non-residents 21 years of age or older with a valid ID showing proof of age may purchase and possess up to half of the total amount that legal residents are able to. The bill died in committee shortly after being introduced. On February 24, 2023 Iowa House Democrats introduced a revised version of the bill, house bill HF442. This bill died in chamber soon after being introduced as well.

== Law enforcement CBD seizures ==
In 2018 law enforcement in Iowa began seizing products that say they contain CBD without testing. Iowa's 124E Medical CBD law states that any Medical CBD must be treated as marijuana without licensing, but defines Medical CBD as "any pharmaceutical grade cannabinoid found in the plant Cannabis sativa L. or Cannabis indica or any other preparation thereof that has a tetrahydrocannabinol level of no more than three percent and that is delivered in a form recommended by the medical cannabidiol board, approved by the board of medicine, and adopted by the department pursuant to rule." The confusion comes from what would be considered pharmaceutical grade CBD and what would be considered a dietary supplement. Some of the products seized in Muscatine Iowa were sent to the state crime lab for test. No analytical data of the concentrations of CBD, tetrahydrocannabinol, or other cannabinoids were provided.

== Polling ==
An early 2014 poll by Iowa Poll showed that Iowans favored legalizing medical marijuana 59%-31%, but opposed recreational marijuana 28%-69%.

A poll in February 2019 showed that Iowans were equal in support of and in opposition to legalization of recreational marijuana (48%-48%). The same poll showed that Iowans are in favor of expansion of medical marijuana access (78%-18%).

A poll in March 2020 showed another increase of support to recreational marijuana legalization (53%-41%) as well as expansion of medical marijuana access (81%-13%).

== Feral hemp ==
Feral hemp, descended from plants once farmed for industrial hemp, grows wild in Iowa and many neighboring states. It is very low in tetrahydrocannabinol content.

== Iowa Hemp Act ==
In 2019, in response to the 2018 United States farm bill, the Iowa Legislature passed and Governor Reynolds signed into law the Iowa Hemp Act that defined a plan to allow the growth of industrial hemp, defined as cannabis with 0.3% or less of THC. The USDA approved the plan in March 2020. On June 17, 2020 Governor Reynolds signed HF2581 which explicitly legalized the possession and sale of consumable hemp products including CBD. Iowa law classifies hemp products "intended to be introduced into the human body by any method of inhalation" as marijuana and are therefore illegal.
