= Hemp loophole =

Loophole in US hemp-farming legislation from 2018 to 2026

The hemp loophole refers to a legal disparity created by the Hemp Farming Act of 2018 within the Agriculture Improvement Act of 2018 (the 2018 Farm Bill). By defining legal hemp specifically by its concentration of delta-9-tetrahydrocannabinol (Δ^{9}-THC), the law inadvertently permitted the production and sale of other psychoactive cannabinoids derived from hemp, such as delta-8-THC (Δ^{8}-THC) and tetrahydrocannabinolic acid (THCA).

The loophole has been taken advantage of by a multi-billion dollar "intoxicating hemp" industry that operates largely outside of the regulatory frameworks governing state-legal recreational cannabis. In November 2025, federal legislation was enacted to close the loophole by shifting to a "total THC" standard, effective November 12, 2026.

== Origins and legal mechanism ==
The 2018 Farm Bill removed hemp from the Controlled Substances Act (CSA) and defined it as the plant Cannabis sativa L. containing no more than 0.3% delta-9 THC on a dry-weight basis. Because the statutory language explicitly named only the Δ^{9} isomer, other intoxicating compounds (whether naturally occurring in small amounts or synthesized from hemp-derived cannabidiol (CBD)) remained technically compliant with federal law by adhering to the Δ^{9} limit.

Key substances popularized as a result of the loophole include:

- Delta-8 THC, a psychoactive isomer of THC typically synthesized from CBD through chemical catalysis. Prior to 2018, such isomers were arguably subject to the Federal Analogue Act as chemical analogues of Δ^{9}-THC.
- Raw THCA flower (the dried and cured buds of the plant) with high levels of tetrahydrocannabinolic acid; because THCA only converts to Δ^{9}-THC when heated (via decarboxylation), the raw plant often tests below the 0.3% threshold, allowing it to be sold as "hemp" despite being functionally identical to marijuana when smoked.

== Judicial and state responses ==
Between 2021 and 2025, several federal courts upheld the legality of hemp-derived intoxicants. In the landmark 2022 case AK Futures LLC v. Boyd St. Distro, LLC, the United States Court of Appeals for the Ninth Circuit ruled that the 2018 Act legalized all hemp-derived "isomers" and "derivatives," effectively preempting the Federal Analogue Act for hemp-derived products. This ruling established that as long as the source plant met the 0.3% Δ^{9}-THC limit, its psychoactive derivatives were not illegal analogues.

Conversely, many states attempted to ban these products through local legislation. In Bio Gen LLC v. Sanders, the United States Court of Appeals for the Eighth Circuit affirmed in 2025 that states retain the authority to regulate hemp more stringently than federal law, allowing state-level bans on delta-8 and other isomers to remain in force.

== 2026 federal closure ==
On November 12, 2025, President Donald Trump signed the 2026 Extensions Act (H.R. 5371), which included provisions to formally close the hemp loophole. The law introduced two major restrictions:

- Total THC standard: hemp is redefined to limit the "total THC" (including THCA and all isomers) to 0.3% on a dry-weight basis.
- Milligram cap: final consumer products are limited to a maximum of 0.4 milligrams of total THC per container, effectively banning most intoxicating gummies and beverages.

The law provides for a one-year implementation period, with full enforcement beginning in November 2026. Industry analysts estimate this will affect 95% of the existing retail hemp market.

== See also ==
- Cannabis in the United States
- Legal history of cannabis in the United States
