= Cannabis in Nebraska =

Cannabis in Nebraska is legal for medical use. First offense for possession of small amounts was reduced to a civil infraction in 1979.

== History ==
=== Industrial hemp (1887) ===
According to the USDA, the first crop of industrial hemp in Nebraska was grown in Fremont in 1887 by men from Champaign, Illinois.

=== Prohibition (1927) and partial decriminalization (1979) ===
Amidst an early 20th century trend of limiting the drug, Nebraska first restricted cannabis in 1927.

In 1969, Nebraska eased penalties for cannabis possession in the state, limiting the penalty for first-time possession to no more than 7 days in jail. Marijuana was decriminalized to a civil infraction for first-time offenders in 1978 or 1979.

Testimony given by Nebraska prosecutors and local law enforcement officials before the Nebraska Legislature Judiciary Committee in 2014 showed the different counties in Nebraska respond to marijuana in significantly differing ways. Some county attorneys and sheriffs take an approach emphasizing strict enforcement, while others take an approach that deemphasizes prosecution for minor offenses.

=== Unsuccessful lawsuit against Colorado ===
In 2013 and 2014, after the neighboring state of Colorado legalized the use of marijuana, the marijuana arrest rate in Nebraska increased by 11 percent. The amount spent by Nebraska to enforce its marijuana laws also increased by 11 percent (to an estimated $10.2 million). Most of the increase in arrests and enforcement spent came in western Nebraska (the "Nebraska Panhandle") next to the Colorado border, and particularly along Interstate 80 which traverses the entire state. Experts expressed uncertainty whether the spike was caused by the change in Colorado law, by increased enforcement by Nebraska police, or some combination of factors.

In December 2014, Nebraska and Oklahoma sought permission from the Supreme Court of the United States to file an original action against the State of Colorado, asking to Court to strike down Colorado's legalization of cannabis. Nebraska and Oklahoma argued that it had resulted in a spillover of cannabis activity into their states, and thus increasing enforcement expenses and social harm. They argued that the Colorado legislation was "preempted by federal law, and therefore unconstitutional and unenforceable under the Supremacy Clause."

In March 2016, the Court denied Nebraska and Oklahoma's request to proceed with its suit. Justice Clarence Thomas, joined by Justice Samuel Alito, dissented, writing that they would have heard the claim against Colorado.

=== Unsuccessful 2015 medical cannabis proposal ===
In 2015, LB643, the "Cannabis Compassion and Care Act," was proposed in the unicameral state legislature. The legislation would have allowed certain patients with prescriptions to use marijuana in liquid or pill form (but not smoked leaf form) for medical purposes. Patients would only be eligible if they suffered from certain serious illnesses, such as cancer, glaucoma, HIV/AIDS, and hepatitis C. Following an initial 27–12 vote in favor, the bill's sponsor, Senator Tommy Garrett of Bellevue requested the bill be held until 2016, due to conflicting priorities as the senators dealt with the fallout from the legislature's 2015 prohibition of capital punishment.

In 2016 the bill was blocked by a Senate filibuster, falling three votes short of the number failed to advance. The bill encountered the "stiff opposition" of Governor Pete Ricketts and Attorney General Doug Peterson.

=== Unsuccessful 2020 medical cannabis ballot measure ===
A medical cannabis ballot measure was invalidated by the Nebraska Supreme Court for containing more than one question.

=== 2024 medical cannabis legalization and lawsuit ===
On November 5th, 2024, measures 437 and 438 were both approved by voters initially legalizing medical use.

Former Republican state senator and State Board of Health member John Kuehn sued the campaign that put medical cannabis on the ballot over the validity of the signatures it had collected. Secretary of State Bob Evnen (R) and Attorney General Mike Hilgers (R) both filed court documents contesting the legitimacy of almost 49,000 signatures on the two petitions. They said that more than half involved “notary malfeasance.” Evnen requested that the court ascertain the exact number of legitimate signatures and void the results if there aren't enough. The lawsuit was resolved on December 11, 2024, when Lancaster County District Court Judge Susan Strong ruled she would not issue an injunction, allowing the law to go into effect on December 12.

The ballot measures legalized the sale and possession of up to 5 ounces of cannabis for medical use, and established a Nebraska Medical Cannabis Commission as the state regulatory agency. These measures did not set out a legal mechanism for the cultivation of cannabis. A bill to set out rules for medical cannabis regulation died in the legislature in 2025.

== Botany ==
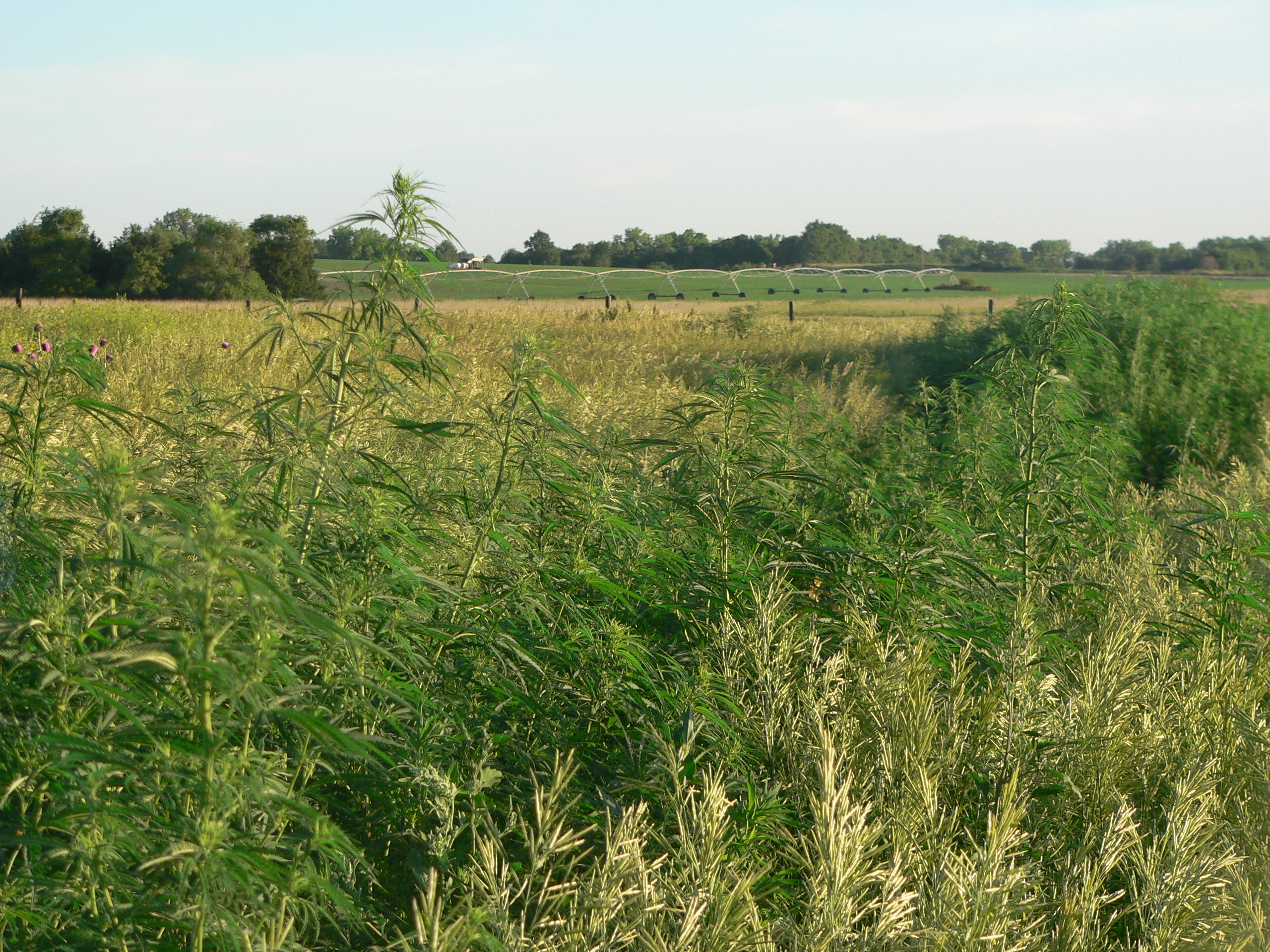
Cannabis growing wild in a ditch in Buffalo County

Nebraska is noted for the presence of feral hemp plants, low in psychoactive THC and generally known as "ditch weed" (or more rarely "Nebraska Nonsense"). A 1987 study noted that 12.4 million cannabis plants were eradicated in Nebraska annually. Hemp researcher David West recommended that farmers store feral hemp seed prior to legalization, in hopes of rebuilding a stock of landrace strain of indigenous cannabis.
