= Cannabis in American Samoa =

Cannabis in the American Samoa is fully illegal. Possession of any amount can result in a five year sentence of imprisonment and a mandatory $5,000 fine.

The 2001 American Samoa Drug Threat Assessment produced by the National Drug Intelligence Center notes that marijuana is the most widely used illegal drug on the island, though at 25% for youth lifetime use, its prevalence is just over half that of mainland America's 47%.

Marijuana grows wild on the island, and is produced locally for local consumption, as well as smuggled in by ship from the nation of Samoa, though otherwise there is little evidence of cross-national trafficking of marijuana in Oceania as most regional countries are self-sufficient in its supply.
