= Wilson Compton (academic) =

American psychiatrist

Wilson M. Compton is the deputy director of the National Institute on Drug Abuse (NIDA). Before being appointed to this position in 2013, he was the director of the NIDA's Division of Epidemiology, Services and Prevention Research since 2002. He has also served as a member of the DSM-5 Task Force and the Substance Use Disorders Workgroup. Before joining NIDA, he was an associate professor of psychiatry at the Washington University School of Medicine and the medical director of addiction services at Barnes-Jewish Hospital in St. Louis

== Education ==
Compton earned his undergraduate education from Amherst College and his medical degree from Washington University in St. Louis.

== Work ==
Compton has studied trends in the use of illegal drugs in the United States, including marijuana, and the frequency with which Americans misuse opioid painkillers that they are prescribed.

== Awards ==
Compton received the Senior Scholar Health Services Research Award from the American Psychiatric Association in 2008, the Paul Hoch Award from the American Psychopathological Association in 2010, and two Leveraging Collaboration Awards from the Food and Drug Administration (one in 2012 and one in 2013). He received the Department of Health and Human Services' Secretary's Award for Meritorious Service in 2013 and their Award for Distinguished Service in 2014. In 2018, he received the Dr. James West Quality Improvement Award from the National Association of Addiction Treatment Providers.
