= Cannabis in Puerto Rico =

Cannabis in Puerto Rico is illegal for recreational use. Legislation to ban cannabis was passed in 1932, and legislation to legalize medical use was passed in 2017. Although the medical use of cannabis is permitted, smoking it is prohibited.

== Prohibition (1932) ==
On April 19, 1932, Puerto Rico enacted Act 12, "An Act to Punish the Planting, Importation, Purchase, and Sale of Marijuana, and for Other Purposes" (Spanish: "Ley para castigar la siembra, importación, compra y venta de la marijuana, y para otros fines"). The included penalties were a minimum of one month and maximum of one year in jail.

On May 13, 1934, Puerto Rico enacted Act No. 61, in keeping with the 1934 Uniform State Narcotic Drug Act.

== Attempted decriminalization (2013) ==
In 2013, Representative José Luis Báez proposed decriminalization, however polling by the newspaper El Nuevo Día indicated that 26% of those surveyed were in favor of decriminalization, with 70% against and 4% unsure.

== Medical cannabis ==
In May 2015, Governor Alejandro Garcia Padilla signed an executive order permitting the use of medical cannabis.

On July 9, 2017, Governor Padilla signed Act 42–2017, named the Act to Manage the Study, Development and Investigation of Cannabis for Innovation, Applicable Norms, and Limitations, into law, officially legalizing cannabis for medicinal purposes in the commonwealth.

This legislation also sets up a system of dispensaries and cultivators that will provide safe, legal access to medicinal marijuana for those in need. Additionally, lawmakers are exploring the possibility of recreational legalization in the near future as well. As public opinion continues to shift on cannabis use, Puerto Rico is expected by some analysts to provide more opportunities for legal consumption of marijuana.

The Department of Health has been tasked with creating regulations to ensure safe and effective use of cannabis products. This includes setting up licensing requirements for dispensaries, cultivators, processors, and caregivers. It also requires safety protocols such as testing of all products prior to sale and labeling requirements that clearly state the contents of each product. With these regulations in place, Puerto Ricans can feel confident when accessing legal marijuana from licensed providers.

The government has also established a system of taxation on recreational cannabis sales. The taxes are used for social programs and public education initiatives about responsible consumption and other related matters. These funds will serve to support the people of Puerto Rico who have been most affected by prohibition in the past.

This legislation marks an important shift in public opinion towards cannabis use in Puerto Rico. It is clear that the people of this Caribbean island are ready to move forward and create a safe, responsible system for access to cannabis products. With proper regulation and education, Puerto Rico can be an example for other Caribbean countries looking to explore their own potential for marijuana legalization.
