= Cannabis in Louisiana =

Cannabis in Louisiana is legal only for medicinal use; recreational possession of 14 grams or less is decriminalized punishable by a fine of no more than $100. Medicinal use is allowed with a physician's written recommendation for any debilitating condition. Prior to statewide decriminalization, possession of small amounts of marijuana was first decriminalized in the cities of New Orleans, Baton Rouge, and Shreveport.

== Legality ==
=== Prohibition (1920s) ===
Sources give varying dates for the prohibition of cannabis in Louisiana, generally either 1924 or 1927.

Despite this law, and newspaper accounts of contemporaneous cannabis use in New Orleans, in 1930 there were only 30 marijuana convictions in the entire state. In 1938 mobster Carlos Marcello was arrested when the authorities uncovered what was then described as "the biggest marijuana ring in New Orleans history". He received a ten-month sentence.

=== Reduction of criminal penalties ===
On June 30, 2015, Governor Bobby Jindal signed SB 143, which significantly reduced penalties for possession of cannabis. Under the bill, first time possession is punishable by a $300 fine and 15 days in jail, a second offense by up to a $1,000 fine and six months in jail, a third offense by up a $2,500 fine and up to two years in jail, and fourth or subsequent offenses by up to a $5,000 fine and eight years in prison.

=== Decriminalization ===
On June 15, 2021, Governor John Bel Edwards signed HB 652 which decriminalized possession of small amounts of marijuana statewide. Under the bill, possession of less than 14 grams of cannabis is punishable by a $100 fine and no threat of jail time for the first and every subsequent offense. The reduced penalties took effect August 1, 2021. Possession of more than 14 grams and illegal distribution still carry harsh penalties. Punishment for possession over 14 grams, distribution, and cultivation can range anywhere from 6 months to 30 years in prison, and $500 to $50,000 in fines.

According to Louisiana legislature, cannabis is described as any part of the cannabis plant that can be used to either grow more of the cannabis plant or any part that can be used as a drug. However, the legislature states that the stems of the plant are not illegal to have as long as the stems are being used for fiber production; the seeds are also allowed to be owned under government law as long as they are not fertile and not capable of growing a new plant.

Despite medical marijuana being decriminalized, it is still possible to be arrested if you are operating a motor vehicle under the influence.

=== Discriminatory bail amounts ===
In 1996, a study was performed that studied the bail amounts of white and non-white inmates who were arrested for possession of marijuana. The study took into account race, gender, amount of product on the persons when arrested, and what state the individual lived in. After conducting the study, Lee and Ruiz found that people of color had a much higher bail amount than white individuals who were arrested for the same crime.

== Medical cannabis (2015–present) ==
On June 30, 2015, Governor Bobby Jindal signed HB 149, which sets up a framework for dispensing marijuana for medical purposes. On Tuesday, August 6, 2019, medical cannabis was dispensed in the state for the first time, supplied by cannabis grower GB Sciences. In August 2020, HB 819, signed by Governor John Bel Edwards, greatly expanded access to medical cannabis. HB 819 allows any licensed doctor in good standing with the state to recommend cannabis for any condition the doctor "considers debilitating to an individual patient and is qualified through his medical education and training to treat." The bill expanded access to candidates with conditions not limited to, but including "neuro-degenerative diseases, traumatic brain injury, chronic pain, and any conditions requiring hospice or palliative care." Louisiana does not assign medical marijuana cards to patients; a doctor's recommendation sent to the patient's local dispensary is the only requirement. Effective January 1st 2022, the law expanded to now allow raw flower marijuana to be purchasable through dispensaries. Possession of up to 2.5oz of cannabis flower will be legal for medicinal purposes. On June 6, 2022, Act 491 was signed by Governor John Bel Edwards expanding dispensary access by allowing existing dispensaries to start an additional dispensary only in their respective region, if they meet a customer requirement of 3500. Currently, dispensaries in Louisiana can only operate in their respective region, assigned to them by the Louisiana Department of Health. As of July 2022, each of the nine regions has only one dispensary. Marijuana plants grown for recreational/medicinal purposes, outside of licensed growers, are not allowed in Louisiana.

=== Demographics of dispensary patients ===
A study was conducted of around 1200 people who frequented medical marijuana dispensaries around Louisiana; over 85% of them were of white descent, while only 11% were of black descent. The patients who were interviewed had an average age of 51 with around 65% of them having a history of smoking non-medically prescribed marijuana. These patients were also asked how they ingested the THC/CBD before they were prescribed medical marijuana, with the most common being smoking (no specific form) and the least common being topical cream. Men were also found to be three times more likely to be taking prescription opioids while taking medical marijuana than women. Their findings have also stated that women are much more likely to have suffered some form of psychosis in the past before their medical marijuana prescription.

== Cannabis and COVID-19 ==
A study was conducted during the height of the COVID-19 pandemic studying how recreational marijuana usage is prevalent in college students. This study follows 727 individuals located in Louisiana. Louisiana was chosen to be the location of this study since it was one of the states with the highest COVID-19 cases and deaths. The hypothesis of this study is that if people are recreationally smoking marijuana during the pandemic, they will start to attain psychosocial tendencies and lose the ability to function as normal. 184 of these individuals admitted to already having used marijuana recreationally before the pandemic. After conducting this study, the researchers found that these college students were starting to behave differently and started having trouble processing and understanding their own emotions. The marijuana was not said to cause these emotions on their own, but exacerbate the already underlying feelings.

== 2023 medical cannabis reforms and updates ==
In June 2023, several bills passed the Louisiana Legislature to "reform and update" medical cannabis legislation. The Governor of Louisiana is yet to either sign or veto the bills. The Governor of Louisiana however signed a bill into law that implements the “expungement” of certain cannabis criminal records of individuals - based under certain conditions and circumstances (i.e. up to 14g possession and being a first time offender).
