= Δ8-Tetrahydrocannabinol =

Isomer of tetrahydrocannabinol

Δ^{8}-Tetrahydrocannabinol

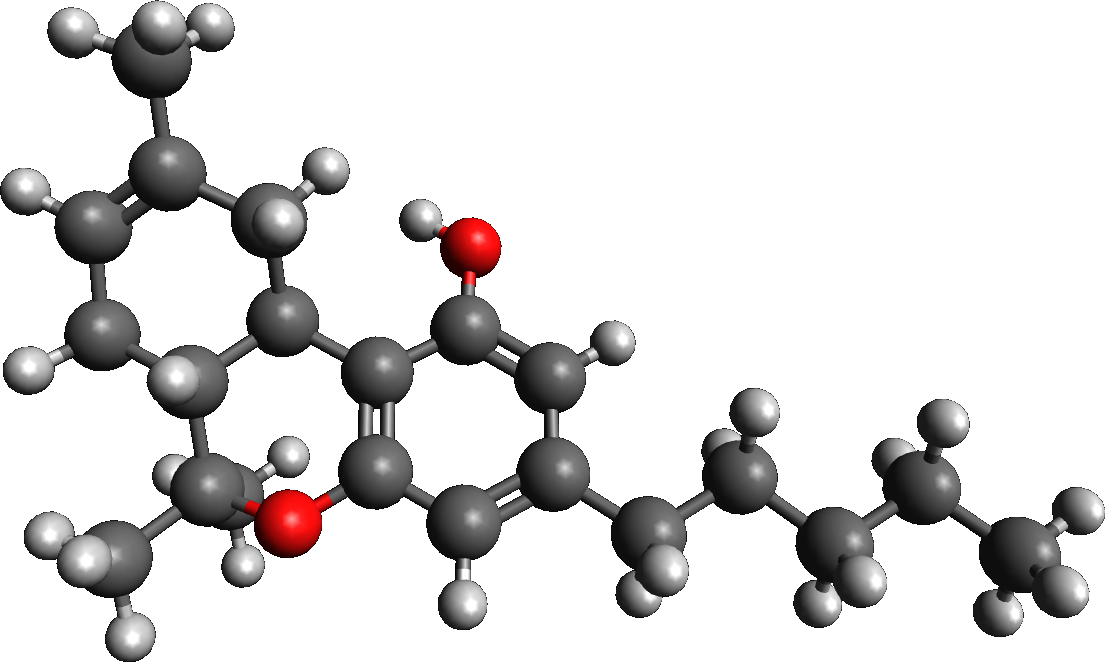

Clinical data
- Other names: Δ8-THC; Δ-8-THC; Δ8-THC; δ-8-THC; (−)-trans-Δ8-tetrahydrocannabinol; (−)-trans-Δ8-tetrahydrocannabinol
- Drug class: Cannabinoid receptor agonist
- ATC code: None

Legal status
- Legal status: US: Disputed

Identifiers
- IUPAC name: 6,6,9-Trimethyl-3-pentyl-6a,7,10,10a-tetrahydrobenzo[c]chromen-1-ol
- CAS Number: 5957-75-5
- PubChem CID: 2977
- ChemSpider: 553592
- UNII: B49D0HH807
- KEGG: C22741
- ChEMBL: ChEMBL46518
- CompTox Dashboard (EPA): DTXSID20878586
- ECHA InfoCard: 100.165.076

Chemical and physical data
- Formula: C_{21}H_{30}O_{2}
- Molar mass: 314.469 g·mol^{−1}
- 3D model (JSmol): Interactive image
- SMILES: CCCCCC1=CC(=C2C3CC(=CCC3C(OC2=C1)(C)C)C)O
- InChI: InChI=1S/C21H30O2/c1-5-6-7-8-15-12-18(22)20-16-11-14(2)9-10-17(16)21(3,4)23-19(20)13-15/h9,12-13,16-17,22H,5-8,10-11H2,1-4H3; Key:HCAWPGARWVBULJ-UHFFFAOYSA-N

Δ^{8}-Tetrahydrocannabinol (delta-8-THC, (Note: Commonly called "delta-8 THC", or just "delta 8".) Δ^{8}-THC) is a psychoactive cannabinoid found in the Cannabis plant. It is an isomer of Δ^{9}-tetrahydrocannabinol (delta-9-THC, Δ^{9}-THC), with which it co-occurs in hemp; natural quantities of ∆^{8}-THC found in hemp are low. Psychoactive effects are similar to that of Δ^{9}-THC, with central effects occurring by binding to cannabinoid receptors found in various regions of the brain.

Partial synthesis of ∆^{8}-THC was published in 1941 by Roger Adams and colleagues at the University of Illinois. After the 2018 United States farm bill was signed, ∆^{8}-THC products synthesized from industrial hemp by acid-catalyzed cyclization experienced a rise in popularity; THC products have been sold in licensed recreational cannabis and medical cannabis industries within the United States in California, Pennsylvania, and medicinally licensed in Michigan and Oregon. According to a March 2024 study, 11% of US twelfth graders in the study had used ∆^{8}-THC over the past 12 months.

== Effects ==
∆^{8}-THC is moderately less potent than Δ^{9}-THC. This means that while its effects are similar to that of Δ^{9}-THC, as both are psychoactive cannabinoids, it would take more ∆^{8}-THC to achieve a comparable level of effect.

A 1973 study testing the effects of ∆^{8}-THC in dogs and monkeys reported that a single oral dose of 9,000 milligrams per kilogram of body mass (mg/kg) was nonlethal in all dogs and monkeys studied. The same study reported that the median lethal dose of ∆^{8}-THC in rats was comparable to that of ∆^{9}-THC. Both isomers of THC have been found to cause a transient increase in blood pressure in rats, although the effects of cannabinoids on the cardiovascular system are complex. Animal studies indicate that ∆^{8}-THC exerts many of its central effects by binding to cannabinoid receptors found in various regions of the brain, including the cerebral cortex, thalamus, basal ganglia, hippocampus, and cerebellum.

== Adverse effects ==
As of 2022, there had been at least 104 adverse event reports made for ∆^{8}-THC, and at least two deaths associated with ∆^{8}-THC products. US national poison control centers received 2,362 exposure cases of Δ^{8}-THC products between 1 January 2021 and 28 February 2022; 58% of these exposures involved adults, and 70% thought they required medical care.

As of 2022, the safety profile, including risks of psychosis and addiction after regular, long-term ∆^{8}-THC use was unknown.

== Pharmacology ==
=== Mechanism of action ===
The pharmacodynamic profile of ∆^{8}-THC is similar to that of ∆^{9}-THC. It is a partial agonist of CB_{1} and CB_{2} cannabinoid receptors with about half the potency of ∆^{9}-THC in most but not all measures of biological activity.

=== Pharmacokinetics ===
The pharmacokinetic profile of ∆^{8}-THC is also similar to that of ∆^{9}-THC. Following ingestion in humans, hepatic cytochrome P450 enzymes including CYP2C9 and CYP3A4 first convert ∆^{8}-THC into 11-hydroxy-Δ^{8}-tetrahydrocannabinol (11-OH-Δ^{8}-THC). Next, dehydrogenase enzymes convert 11-OH-Δ^{8}-THC into 11-nor-Δ^{8}-tetrahydrocannabinol-9-carboxylic acid (11-nor-Δ^{8}-THC-9-COOH, also known as Δ^{8}-THC-11-oic acid). Finally, Δ^{8}-THC-11-oic acid undergoes glucuronidation by glucuronidase enzymes to form 11-nor-Δ^{8}-tetrahydrocannabinol-9-carboxylic acid glucuronide (Δ^{8}-THC-COOH-glu), which is then excreted in the urine.

== Chemistry ==
∆^{8}-THC is a tricyclic terpenoid. Although it has the same chemical formula as ∆^{9}-THC, one of its carbon-carbon double bonds is located in a different position. In ∆^{8}-THC, the double bond is between the eighth and ninth carbons in structure, while in Δ^{9}-THC, the double bond is between the ninth and tenth carbons in structure.

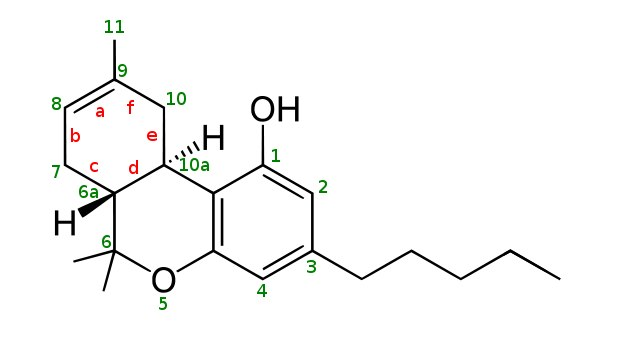
∆^{8}-THC has a double bond (a) between the carbon atoms labeled 8 and 9.

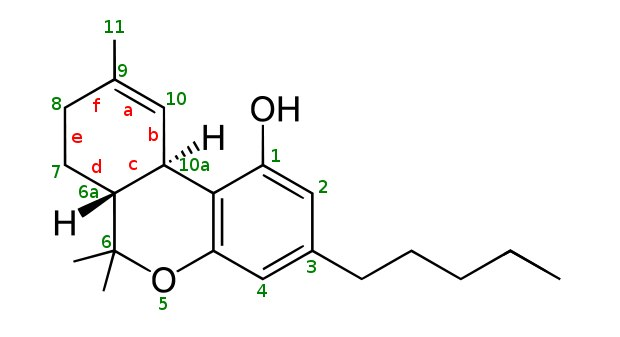
∆^{9}-THC has a double bond (a) between the carbon atoms labeled 9 and 10.

This difference in structure increases the chemical stability of ∆^{8}-THC relative to ∆^{9}-THC, lengthening shelf life and allowing the compound to resist undergoing oxidation to cannabinol over time. Like other cannabinoids, ∆^{8}-THC is very lipophilic (log P = 7.4). It is an extremely viscous, colorless oil at room temperature.

While ∆^{8}-THC is naturally found in plants of the Cannabis genus, this compound can also be produced in an industrial or laboratory setting by acid-catalyzed isomerization of cannabidiol (CBD). Solvents that may be used during this process include dichloromethane, toluene, and hexane. Various Brønsted or Lewis acids that may be used to facilitate this isomerization include tosylic acid, indium(III) triflate, trimethylsilyl trifluoromethanesulfonate, hydrochloric acid, and sulfuric acid. Because it is possible for chemical contaminants to be generated during the process of converting CBD to ∆^{8}-THC, such as Δ^{10}-THC, 9-OH-HHC and other side products, concern has been raised about the safety of untested or impure ∆^{8}-THC products.

The ongoing controversy regarding the legal status of ∆^{8}-THC in the US is complicated by terminology. According to a 2019 literature review published in Clinical Toxicology, the term synthetic cannabinoid typically refers to a full agonist of CB_{1} and CB_{2} cannabinoid receptors. According to the review, the following is stated:

"The psychoactive (and probably the toxic) effects of synthetic cannabinoid receptor agonists are likely due to their action as full receptor agonists and their greater potency at CB1 receptors."

However, ∆^{8}-THC and ∆^{9}-THC are partial agonists of cannabinoid receptors. They are less potent than many synthetic cannabinoids. It has not been definitively proven if full agonism is the reason for the greater incidence of adverse reactions to synthetic cannabinoids since ∆^{9}-THC has been shown to act as a full CB_{1} receptor agonist on specific CB_{1} receptors located in the hippocampus section of the brain. Furthermore, the synthetic cannabinoid EG-018 acts as a partial agonist. The classical cannabinoid structure is that of a dibenzopyran structure. This group includes THC. THC interacts with a different spot inside the CB_{1} receptor than synthetic cannabinoids such as JWH-018. This may explain the differences in adverse reactions to synthetic cannabinoids.

=== Production ===
∆^{8}-THC is typically synthesized from cannabidiol extracted from hemp, as the natural quantities of ∆^{8}-THC found in hemp are low. This is called semisynthesis or partial synthesis. The reaction often yields a mixture that contains other cannabinoids and unknown reaction by-products. As a result, most products sold as ∆^{8}-THC are not actually pure ∆^{8}-THC. Little is known about the identity and the health effects of the impurities. Some manufacturers of ∆^{8}-THC may use household chemicals in the synthesis process, potentially introducing harmful contaminants. In that sense, ∆^{8}-THC is often encountered as a semi-synthetic phytocannabinoid, obtained by (partial) chemical synthesis. It is not to be confused with the term synthetic cannabinoid, however.

== History ==
The partial synthesis of ∆^{8}-THC was published in 1941 by Roger Adams and colleagues at the University of Illinois. In 1942, the same research group studied its physiological and psychoactive effects after oral dosing in human volunteers. Total syntheses of ∆^{8}-THC were achieved in 1965 by Raphael Mechoulam. In 1966, the chemical structure of ∆^{8}-THC isolated from cannabis was characterized using modern methods by Richard L. Hively, William A. Mosher, and Friedrich W. Hoffmann at the University of Delaware. A stereospecific synthesis of ∆^{8}-THC from olivetol and verbenol was reported by Raphael Mechoulam and colleagues at the Weizmann Institute of Science in 1967. ∆^{8}-THC was often referred to as "Delta-6-THC" (Δ^{6}-THC) in early scientific literature, but this name is no longer conventional among most authors.

Δ^{8}-THC is a known impurity in pharmaceutical dronabinol.

== Society and culture ==
=== Legal status in the United States ===
In 1937, cannabis was effectively outlawed by the Marihuana Tax Act, which imposed a prohibitory excise tax. In 1970, the Marihuana Tax Act was repealed and superseded by the Controlled Substances Act (CSA). The CSA replaced "[a] patchwork of regulatory, revenue, and criminal measures" relating to drug control with a "comprehensive regulatory regime".

As of 2024, 24 states have legalized recreational cannabis, with others having reduced penalties. Section 10113 of the Agriculture Improvement Act of 2018 (2018 Farm Bill), amended the Agricultural Marketing Act of 1946, and added a new subtitle G related to hemp. Under section 297A of that subtitle, is the definition of hemp as used in federal law:

The term "hemp" means the plant Cannabis sativa L. and any part of that plant, including the seeds thereof and all derivatives, extracts, cannabinoids, isomers, acids, salts, and salts of isomers, whether growing or not, with a delta-9 tetrahydrocannabinol concentration of not more than 0.3 percent on a dry weight basis.

— Section 297A of the Agricultural Marketing Act of 1946 (7 U.S.C. 1639o)

In October 2020, the DEA Interim Final Rule addressed synthetic cannabinoids. Some believed that this also applied to ∆^{8}-THC products and other hemp derivatives addressed by the Farm Bill. The University of Arkansas National Agriculture Law Center has maintained an index of litigation surrounding hemp and ∆^{8}-THC products. Despite claims of legality by manufacturers, independent testing of products has often uncovered that many products contain ∆^{9}-THC concentrations beyond the allowable 0.3 percent legal threshold . There exists a "hazy legal landscape" surrounding ∆^{8}-THC and other hemp-derived tetrahydrocannabinols.

On 12 November 2025, in order to end the 2025 United States federal government shutdown, the 119th United States Congress enacted the Continuing Appropriations, Agriculture, Legislative Branch, Military Construction and Veterans Affairs, and Extensions Act, 2026, which contains a rider under section 781 that, effective 12 November 2026, will redefine the federal legal definition of hemp in a way that would "likely make industrial hemp-derived cannabis products, including delta-8 and delta-10 THC as well as synthetic THC products like edibles, drinks, oils and vapes, incredibly difficult, if not impossible, to sell legally".

==== FDA ====
∆^{8}-THC has not been evaluated or approved by the US Food and Drug Administration (FDA) for safe use in any context. The FDA has taken action against businesses that have illegally marketed ∆^{8}-THC for therapeutic use. The FDA has also taken action against businesses that sold ∆^{8}-THC in forms that closely resemble (typically non-psychoactive) food products such as chips or cookies.

==== Individual states ====
Legal status of ∆^{8}-THC by US state. Legal, no state law regulating ∆^{8}-THC Legal, regulated under state law Illegal

While legal action against ∆^{8}-THC has not been widespread in the United States, some people have faced legal repercussions, leading to confusion as to its legal status within the United States.

In 2021, one store owner in Menomonee Falls, Wisconsin was facing a sentence of up to 50 years for allegedly selling ∆^{8}-THC products with illegal amounts of ∆^{9}-THC. Other raids and arrests have happened due to the ∆^{9}-THC content of these products in North Carolina and Texas, among other places. In 2022, Catoosa County, Georgia Sheriff Sisk announced to prosecute stores distributing ∆^{8}-THC with non-compliant ∆^{9}-THC levels: "The products the sheriffs office has purchased and tested all contain significant levels of delta-9. [We have the] evidence needed to move forward with prosecution and seizures." There are also issues related to incidental manufacture of ∆^{9}-THC, as it is produced as an intermediate in the acid catalyzed isomerization of CBD.

∆^{8}-THC products have been sold in licensed, regulated recreational cannabis and medical cannabis industries within the United States including California and Pennsylvania's licensed, regulated medical cannabis system since 2020. Both Michigan and the state of Oregon have regulated Δ^{8}-THC products sold under their regulated cannabis system.

==== Federal litigation ====
The first case before a United States courts of appeals relating to the legality of ∆^{8}-THC was AK Futures v. Boyd St. Distro (2022), a trademark lawsuit where the 9th Circuit found that ∆^{8}-THC products qualified for trademark protection. The legality of ∆^{8}-THC was addressed briefly in dicta, where the court held the products subject of the litigation were lawful. Although legal under federal law, the 4th Circuit has upheld ∆^{8}-THC regulations under Virginia state law.

At the federal district court level, the United States District Court for the Western District of Arkansas reached a similar conclusion to the 9th Circuit, yet the United States District Court for the District of Wyoming upheld state legislation passed in 2024 that banned ∆^{8}-THC in Wyoming and found that the 2018 Farm Bill did not imply for preemption of state laws such as those in Wyoming.

=== Economics ===
Common ∆^{8}-THC products range from bulk quantities of unrefined distillate to prepared cannabis edibles and atomizer cartridges. In the US, they are usually marketed as legal alternatives to their ∆^{9}-THC counterparts.

∆^{8}-THC products partially synthesized from industrial hemp experienced a rise in popularity in the US following the passage of the 2018 Farm Bill. This led to it being sold by a diverse range of retailers, including head shops, smoke shops, vape shops, dispensaries, gas stations, and convenience stores.

In March 2024, a study of self-reported prevalence of Δ^{8}-THC use among US twelfth graders was published: Of those reporting Δ^{8}-THC use, 35% had used it at least 10 times in the past 12 months. Consumption was lower in Western states than in Southern states and lower in states where Δ^{8}-THC was regulated versus those where it was not regulated.

== Research ==
Although it is a minor constituent of Cannabis, no large clinical studies have been conducted on ∆^{8}-THC alone as of 2022. One study (ongoing as of November 2023) is focused on determining the degree of pharmacologic and pharmacokinetic similarity between ∆^{8}-THC and ∆^{9}-THC.
