= Agriculture Improvement Act of 2018 =

United States law

- Long title: To provide for the reform and continuation of agricultural and other programs of the Department of Agriculture through fiscal year 2023, and for other purposes.
- Enacted by: the 115th United States Congress

Citations
- Public law: Pub. L. 115–334 (text) (PDF)

Legislative history
- Introduced in the House of Representatives as H.R. 2 by Mike Conaway (R–TX) on April 12, 2018; Committee consideration by House Committee on Agriculture; Passed the House of Representatives on June 21, 2018 (Yeas: 213; Nays: 211); Passed the Senate on June 28, 2018 (Yeas: 86; Nays: 11 with amendment); Reported by the joint conference committee on December 10, 2018; agreed to by the Senate on December 11, 2018 (Yeas: 87; Nays: 13) and by the House of Representatives on December 12, 2018 (Yeas: 369; Nays: 47); Signed into law by President Donald Trump on December 20, 2018

The 2018 Farm Bill or Agriculture Improvement Act of 2018 is an enacted United States farm bill that reauthorized $867 billion for many expenditures approved in the prior farm bill (the Agricultural Act of 2014). The bill was passed by the Senate and House on December 11 and 12, 2018, respectively. On December 20, 2018, it was signed into law by President Donald Trump.

== History ==
On May 18, 2018, the bill failed in the House of Representatives by a vote of 198–213. All Democrats and 30 Republicans voted against the measure. Republican opposition came largely from members of the conservative Freedom Caucus who believed that some of the bill's provisions would liberalize immigration policy. One of the caucus members, Congressman Jim Jordan, said, "My main focus was making sure we do immigration policy right." Democratic opposition was largely due to the proposed changes to the Supplemental Nutrition Assistance Program (SNAP) that would impose work requirements for recipients. In the runup to introduction in Congress, the American Soybean Association had opposed any cuts versus the 2014 version.

On September 30, some provisions of the 2014 farm bill expired without a replacement while others were funded through end of calendar year 2018. Sticking points were said to be SNAP work requirements, commodity and energy policy, funding, and cotton and other crop subsidies. In late November, a compromise had been reached, removing SNAP work requirements, and the legislation was voted on and passed by the end of the year.

== Provisions ==
The bill "largely continues current farm and nutrition policy" and does not include new requirements for SNAP (food stamps) recipients, but did increase funding for the SNAP Employment and Training Program. The bill also reauthorized Food Distribution Program on Indian Reservations, The Emergency Food Assistance Program (TEFAP), Commodity Supplemental Food Program, and other nutrition programs. The 2018 Farm Bill also increased funding for TEFAP and the Food Insecurity Nutrition Incentive grant program. Some previously temporary programs were made permanent in the 2018 farm bill including promotional funds for farmers markets, organic farming research funds, funding of organizing and education of future farmers, and funding for veteran and minority farmers.

Incorporating some of the text of the Hemp Farming Act of 2018, the farm bill descheduled some cannabis products from the Controlled Substances Act for the first time. One estimate put the U.S. CBD market at $2.3 billion to $23 billion by the 2020s, enabled by the 2018 farm bill. U.S. Senator Mitch McConnell was such a proponent of the hemp provision that American Military News reported that McConnell coined the Twitter hashtag #HempFarmBill.

The 2018 Farm Bill establishes a new federal hemp regulatory system under the US Department of Agriculture which aims to facilitate the commercial cultivation, processing, and marketing of hemp. The 2018 Farm Bill removes hemp and hemp seeds from the statutory definition of marijuana and the DEA schedule of Controlled Substances. It even makes hemp an eligible crop under the federal crop insurance program. The 2018 Farm Bill also allows the transfer of hemp and hemp-derived products across state lines provided the hemp was lawfully produced under a State or Indian Tribal plan or under a license issued under the USDA plan. The hemp legalization is restricted to plants with low levels of delta-9-THC, the psychoactive cannabinoid primarily present in marijuana. Due to a loophole in the bill, it inadvertently legalized several psychoactive cannabinoids (e.g., delta-8-THC, delta-10-THC, HHC, and THCP). These have since become more popular recreationally across the U.S.

Additional revenue to farmers and processors is expected from textiles and other hemp products. The Dog and Cat Meat Trade Prohibition Act of 2018 was passed as part of the bill.
