= List of 2020 United States cannabis reform proposals =

- 2019 ← → 2021
- Legality of cannabis in the United States (2023)
- Status: Legal for recreational use Legal for medical use Illegal

Legalization of cannabis was considered in several U.S. states in 2020. States considered likely to legalize it for recreational use included Arizona, Florida, New Jersey, New Mexico, and New York.

At the beginning of 2020, 11 U.S. states had fully legalized cannabis, creating a "quasi post-Prohibition landscape" according to CNN. Politico reported that the number of states with some form of legalization could reach 40 by year's end. This remained at odds with Federal prohibition at the beginning of the year (see List of Schedule I drugs (US)), although the House of Representatives held hearings in January on bills that could reschedule the substance or deschedule it entirely.

Cannabis legalization was ultimately approved via November ballot measures in four states: Arizona (Proposition 207, 60% Yes), Montana (Initiative 190, 57% Yes), South Dakota (Amendment A, 54% Yes), and New Jersey (Question 1, 67% Yes). Additionally, medical cannabis was legalized via ballot measures during the same election in Mississippi and South Dakota. South Dakota would have become the first state to legalize medical and recreational cannabis simultaneously, but Amendment A was overturned in court the following February; this marked the first time that a legalization ballot measure was overturned. Observers noted that cannabis legalization was approved in states with both conservative and liberal electorates, making it one of the few issues to gain broad bipartisan support in an otherwise highly divisive election.

Vermont, which had previously legalized marijuana possession and home growing, legalized retail marijuana sales in 2020.

Once all ballot measures took effect in 2021, a total of 14 states had legalized cannabis for recreational use.

== Legislation and initiatives introduced in 2020 ==
=== State ===
State	Title	Detail
Alabama	SB165	Medical cannabis, approved by Senate judiciary committee on February 19
Arkansas		Two Arkansas initiatives, both of which are a proposed constitutional amendment for legalized adult cannabis use, were cleared to receive electronic signatures in May.
Arizona	Prop 207	Arizona Proposition 207, legalizing and regulating adult use, was approved by the state Secretary of State for the 2020 ballot on August 10.
Connecticut	SB 16	Connecticut bills to enable adult-use legalization were introduced on February 6 by Senate President Pro Tempore Martin Looney and House Speaker Joe Aresimowicz, the day after Governor Ned Lamont called for legalization in the State of the State address.
Idaho		Signature gathering for Idaho Medical Marijuana Act was derailed by the COVID-19 pandemic and the sponsors abandoned it in March. A June federal court ruling on another case raised the possibility for electronic signature gathering to continue or for the initiative to be placed on the ballot by fiat.
Kentucky		Kentucky medical cannabis bill HB136 was pre-filed in November 2019 for the early 2020 legislative session It was passed by the House Judiciary Committee 17–1 on February 12.
Minnesota	HF 4632	Minnesota HF 4632 was introduced by state House of Representatives majority leader Ryan Winkler (DFL) on May 6. It was a comprehensive 222 page bill including adult-use legalization and regulation via the establishment of a Cannabis Management Board, and expungement of past cannabis-related convictions. There were 33 cosponsors the day it was introduced.
Mississippi		Mississippi removed from the state schedule, FDA-approved drugs derived from cannabis. At the time it was enacted, this comprised only Epidiolex.: Mississippi medical cannabis initiative qualified for the November ballot on January 8, 2020. However, in 2021, the Supreme Court ruled against the vote.
Missouri		The Missouri Secretary of State had approved four adult-use legalization initiatives for signature gathering by the end of January.
Montana	I-190	Montana I-190 submitted by New Approach Montana to the Montana Secretary of State in January. On August 13, the Montana Secretary of State announced it had qualified for the November ballot.
Nebraska		Sponsors for a Nebraska medical cannabis initiative announced in early July that they had gathered sufficient signatures to appear on the November ballot. On August 27, the Nebraska Secretary of State approved the measure for the November ballot.
New Hampshire	SB 420	New Hampshire SB 420, passed in the Senate on February 6, would allow qualified adults to grow cannabis for their own medical use or for those under their care.: New Hampshire House Bill 1648 was approved in a committee on January 28. The bill allows adults to possess up to 3/4 ounce of cannabis and five grams of hashish; growing up to six plants; and gifting of cannabis products between adults. Selling cannabis would remain illegal. The bill was passed in the House on February 20.
New Jersey	S2535	New Jersey S2535, decriminalization for possession of up to 16 ounces of cannabis, was introduced June 4 by state senators Sandra Cunningham, Teresa Ruiz and Ron Rice.: On June 15, the New Jersey Assembly Community Development and Affairs Committee advanced A1897/4269, a bill to decriminalize possession of up to two ounces of cannabis, and reduce penalties for possession of up to five pounds. The bill was passed by the entire Assembly on June 18, 63–10.
New Mexico	SB115	New Mexico SB115, adult use legalization, was introduced January 16, 2020 for a 30-day session beginning later in the month. The plan included a low-income medical cannabis user fund. The bill was approved in the Senate Public Affairs Committee on January 28, then tabled by the Judiciary Committee on February 12.: The budget proposal to the New York Assembly by Governor Andrew Cuomo included legalization–regulation framework based on 2019's Marijuana Regulation and Taxation Act with anticipated annual revenue to the state of up to $300 million. S.7509 and A.9609 included the cannabis provisions, and creation of New York Office of Cannabis Management.
New York		A New York bill sponsored by Senator Liz Krueger and Assemblymember Crystal Peoples-Stokes would set the legal cannabis possession limit for adults at 3 ounces, the highest limit in the nation, and three times the amount preferred by Governor Cuomo.
Ohio		Ohio Regulate Marijuana Like Alcohol Amendment initiative was filed for state Attorney General approval on March 2. A federal judge ruled in May that the state must accept electronic signatures for the initiative.
Oklahoma	State Question 807	Oklahoma State Question 807, an initiated amendment to the Constitution of the State of Oklahoma that would legalize adult-use ("recreational") cannabis, was filed on December 27, 2019, for the November 2020 ballot.
South Dakota		South Dakota Constitutional Amendment A, adult-use legalization, was announced as qualified for the ballot by the Secretary of State on January 6.: South Dakota HB1008, legalizing hemp agriculture, was passed in the House of Representatives on February 11, and was supported by the state governor.
Tennessee	SB1849	Tennessee SB1849, legalizes possession of half ounce or less, introduced in January
Vermont	S.54	Vermont S.54, allowing taxed and regulated sale of cannabis to adults, under a state Cannabis Control Commission, was reconciled by the House and Senate and passed by the House of Representatives 92–56 on September 17.
Virginia	House Bill 972	Virginia House Bill 972, decriminalization of possession of half ounce or less cannabis, was referred by committee on February 5 for a full House of Delegates vote. Senate Bill 2, with similar provisions, was referred out of committee in January. Both bills passed in their respective chamber by February 10. The bills were reconciled and sent to the governor on March 8. It was signed by the state governor on April 11, with a proposed change of due date for a legalization report. According to National Law Review in mid May, it was likely to become law, with implications for allowable pre-employment questions. The governor signed the bill into law on May 21.: Virginia SJ67, a resolution to direct the legislature's Joint Legislative Audit and Review Commission to study cannabis legalization and regulation by 2022, was passed by the Senate on February 6, and by both House and Senate by February 26.

=== US Virgin Islands ===
- Governor of the United States Virgin Islands Albert Bryan requested the territorial legislature to pass an amendment to the existing medical cannabis bill, allowing use by all adults, in order to shore up the government employees retirement system. The proposal included a $10 "day pass" for tourists.

=== Tribal ===
The Oglala Sioux Tribe approved a referendum to allow medical and non-medical cannabis at the Pine Ridge Reservation on March 10.

=== Federal ===
- William M. (Mac) Thornberry National Defense Authorization Act for Fiscal Year 2021

== Legislation introduced in 2019 and advanced in 2020 ==
=== State ===
- Delaware HB110, legalization
- Vermont S.54, authorizing taxed and regulated cannabis sales in the state that legalized possession in 2018, was approved by the Vermont Senate in 2019. It was approved by the House Committee on Government Operations on January 31, 2020, by the House Ways and Means on February 5, and by the Appropriations Committee on February 24, clearing its way for a full House vote. It was approved by the House on February 26. S.54 became law without the state governor's signature in October.

=== Federal ===
- SAFE Banking Act (via 2020 HEROES Act coronavirus relief bill)

== Initiatives and referendums qualified in 2019 ==
The following was qualified by the initiative process in 2019 for the 2020 ballot.

- South Dakota Initiated Measure 26

The following was approved by the state legislature in 2019 for the 2020 ballot.

- New Jersey Cannabis Regulatory and Expungement Aid Modernization Act

== 2020 U.S. Presidential election ==
28 candidates challenging the United States President in the 2020 election declared positions on cannabis reform. None of them were for continuing prohibition, with positions including Federal legalization (22 candidates, including Republican challenger William Weld), states' choice (five candidates), and Federal decriminalization (one candidate). Legalization was among the executive orders drafted by candidate Bernie Sanders for his first 100 days in office, and candidate Elizabeth Warren promised executive action to deschedule marijuana if Congress did not do so by passing the Marijuana Opportunity Reinvestment and Expungement (MORE) Act. Presumptive Democratic candidate Joe Biden reaffirmed his pursuit of national decriminalization in a "Plan for Black America" announced in May.
