= Legal history of cannabis in the United States =

In the United States, regulation on the use, sale, and labeling of cannabis (legal term marijuana or marihuana) began at the state level in the early 20th century, and outright prohibitions began in the 1920s. By the mid-1930s, cannabis was regulated as a drug in every state, including 35 states that adopted the Uniform State Narcotic Drug Act. The first national regulation was the Marihuana Tax Act of 1937.

Cannabis was officially outlawed for any use with the passage of the Controlled Substances Act (CSA) in 1970. Multiple efforts to reschedule cannabis under the CSA have failed, and the U.S. Supreme Court ruled in United States v. Oakland Cannabis Buyers' Cooperative (2001) and Gonzales v. Raich (2005) that the federal government has a right to regulate and criminalize cannabis, even for medical purposes. A rescheduling hearing for cannabis is scheduled for June 2026.

States and other jurisdictions implemented policies that conflicted with federal law, beginning with the passage of California's Proposition 215 in 1996. By 2016, a majority of states had legalized medical cannabis, and in 2012, Colorado and Washington became the first states to legalize recreational use through referendums.

== Early history ==
=== Pre-1850s ===
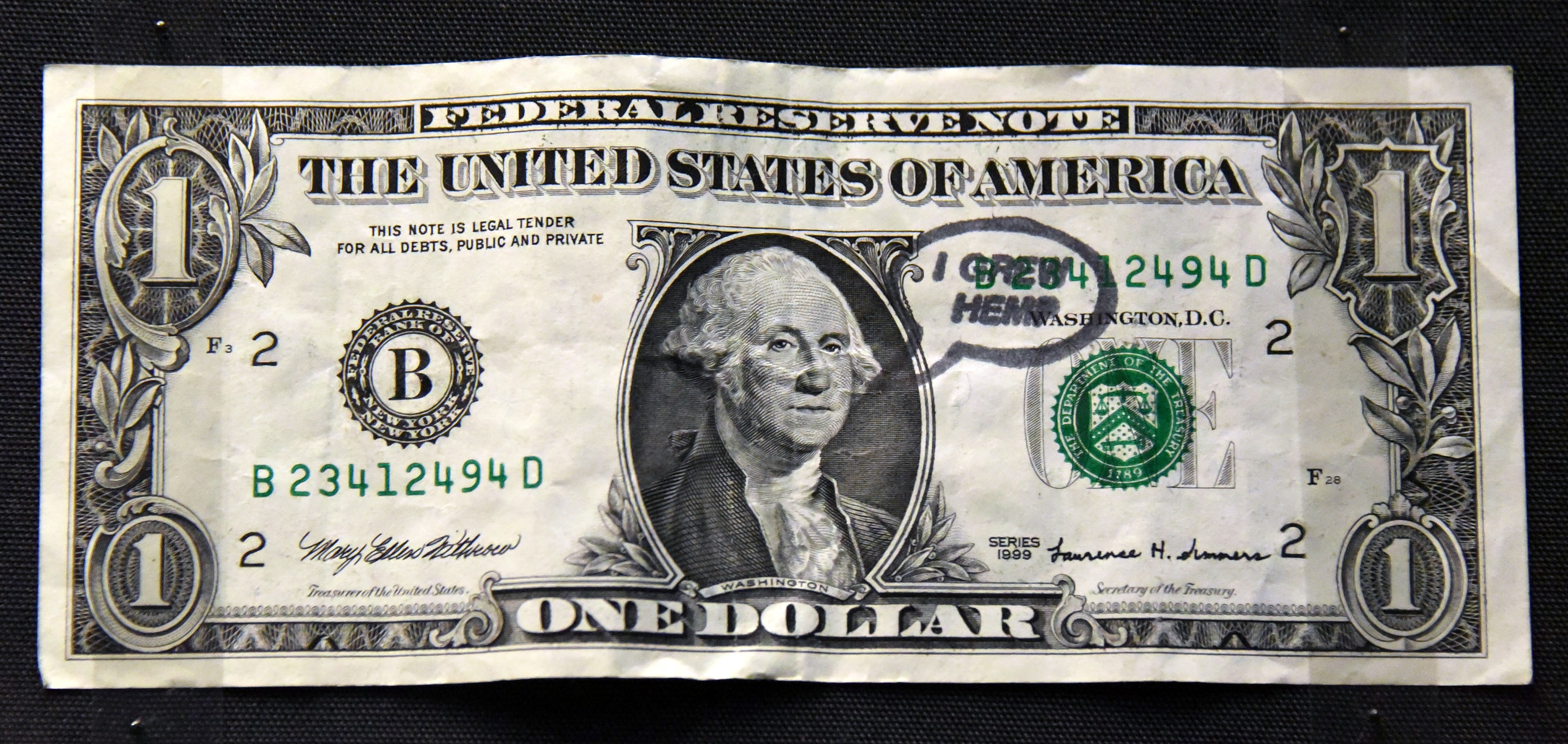
"I grew hemp" defaced 1999 U.S. dollar bill. On display at the British Museum in London. The stamp on this note promotes the legalization of cannabis by referring to the fact that George Washington grew hemp on his estate.

In 1619, King James I decreed that the American colonists of Jamestown would need to increase their support of England. The Virginia Company enacted the decree, asking Jamestown's land owners to grow and export 100 hemp plants to help support England. The colonists' continued cultivation of hemp helped expand its use in the Americas. Cannabis cultivation played a central role in establishing the United States. George Washington grew hemp at Mount Vernon as one of his three primary crops. The use of hemp for rope and fabric became ubiquitous during the 18th and 19th centuries in the United States. Medicinal preparations of cannabis became available in American pharmacies in the 1850s after William Brooke O'Shaughnessy introduced it to Western medicine in 1839.

=== Early pharmaceutical and recreational use ===
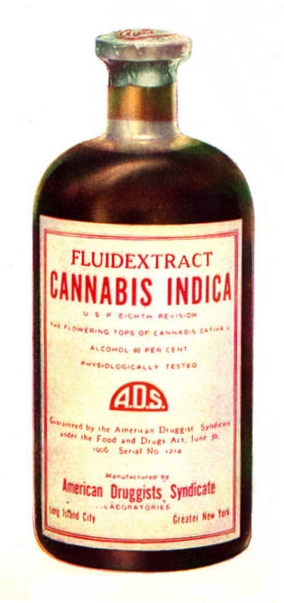
Cannabis fluid extract medicine bottle

During the late 19th century, state governments began regulating the pharmaceutical industry to punish drug adulteration and mislabeling. These anti-narcotic laws required medications to list their harmful effects. If sold outside a licensed pharmacy filling physician prescriptions, the medication would be labeled as a poison. Some regulations prohibited medication sales to minors, restricted prescription refills, and listed approved drugs. Many states accepted cannabis and hemp-based medications in their pharmacopeias.

A 1905 bulletin from the United States Department of Agriculture listed twenty-nine states with laws mentioning cannabis. Eight states and territories are listed with "sale of poisons" laws that specifically mention cannabis: North Carolina, Ohio, Wisconsin, Louisiana, Vermont, Maine, Montana, and the District of Columbia. Wisconsin and Louisiana specifically required a prescription for sale of such medications. Indiana, Rhode Island, Hawaii, Nebraska, Kentucky, Mississippi, and New York did not specify approved drugs, while others did not specify cannabis as a poison, instead allowing it to be sold as medication if accurately labeled.

Following suicides allegedly traced to poisonous substances, New York categorized cannabis as a poison in 1860. A provision requiring cannabis-based medications to be packaged with the word "poison" in red uppercase letting was repealed in 1862. Rather than restricting sales to physician-prescribed need, consumers merely needed to record their name and address with the seller. During the 1880s, the California state legislature considered prohibiting sales of hemp-based narcotics made without a prescription, but it ultimately settled for only regulating opium-based narcotics.

==== Background to later restrictions (late 19th century) ====
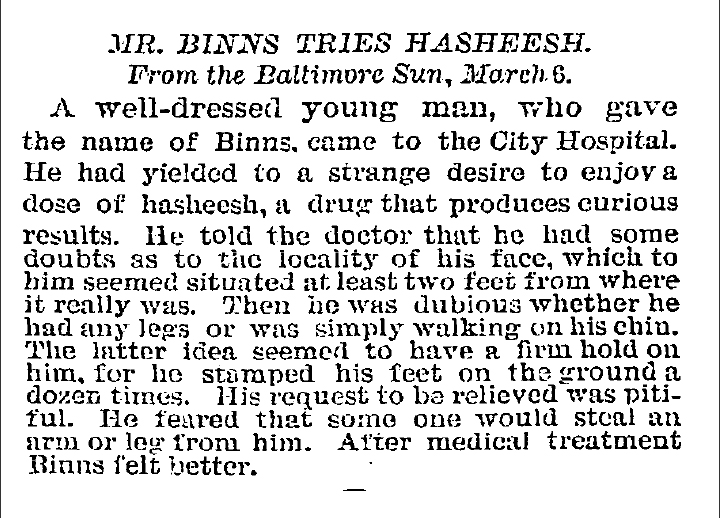
Excerpt from The New York Times, March 6, 1884

As early as 1853, recreational cannabis was listed as a "fashionable narcotic". By the 1880s, oriental-style hashish parlors were flourishing alongside opium dens, to the point that one could be found in every major East Coast city. It was estimated there were around 500 such establishments in New York City alone. An 1883 article in Harper's Magazine described a New York hashish-house frequented by a large clientele, including males and females of "the better classes," and further talks about parlors in Boston, Philadelphia and Chicago. Hemp cigarettes were reportedly used by Mexican soldiers as early as 1874.

== Criminalization (1900s) ==
=== Strengthening of poison laws (1906–1938) ===
The Pure Food and Drug Act was passed by the 59th United States Congress in 1906 and required that certain special drugs, including cannabis, be accurately labeled with their contents. Previously, many drugs had been sold as patent medicines with secret ingredients or misleading labels.

States continued to revise their poison laws in the following years to restrict all narcotic sales to pharmacies solely filling physician prescriptions. In 1906, Congress established a poison law for Washington, D.C., that was ultimately adapted into the 1938 Federal Food, Drug, and Cosmetics Act (FDCA). The FDCA expanded the Food and Drug Administration (FDA)'s authority to seize and destroy non-compliant medications and foods at the manufacturer's expense. Convictions for adulteration and mislabeling were published in Notices of Judgement to deter violations.

New York's 1914 Boylan Act restricted the sale of habit-forming drugs, prohibiting refills to prevent habituation. Doctors could not sell such drugs to anyone with an existing addiction, including themselves. Later that year, the New York City Board of Health classified cannabis as a habit-forming drug after the state law forced users of newly regulated substances to find legal alternatives. California's 1907 Poison Act was the first to explicitly label all hemp-based preparations and compounds as poisons, punishing possession as a misdemeanor. A 1915 amendment clarified that pharmaceutical cannabis remained permissible. In 1914, one of the first cannabis drug raids in the United States occurred in the Mexican-American neighborhood of Sonoratown, Los Angeles, where police raided two "dream gardens" and confiscated a wagonload of cannabis. Many states passed laws regulating marijuana during this period, including: Massachusetts (1911), Maine (1914), Wyoming (1915), Texas (1919), Iowa (1923), Nevada (1923), Oregon (1923), Washington (1923), Arkansas (1923), Nebraska (1927), Louisiana (1927), and Colorado (1929).

During the Mexican Revolution of the 1910s, thousands of Mexicans immigrated to the United States for agricultural work in the Sun Belt region. Many of these Mexican farmworkers smoked marijuana to relax after working in the fields. Cannabis was seen as a cheaper alternative to alcohol after the Eighteenth Amendment to the United States Constitution imposed national Prohibition from 1920 until its 1933 repeal. Later in the 1920s, tensions grew as small farms resented larger ones for relying on cheaper Mexican labor. Shortly afterwards, the Great Depression increased the scarcity of jobs and resources, suggesting that early marijuana regulation was racially motivated.

=== Second International Opium Convention (1925) ===
During the 1925 Second International Opium Convention, the United States led the agreement to prohibit exportation of Indian hemp, also known as hashish, to countries that forbid its use. Importing countries were required to issue certificates approving shipments of hashish and its derivatives for exclusive scientific or medical use. However, the convention left European hemp unregulated, potentially because the United States was the largest producer of this variety. The 1912 edition of the Swedish encyclopedia Nordisk familjebok notes that European hemp (Cannabis sativa) lacks the high THC content of Indian hemp (Cannabis indica).

=== Federal Bureau of Narcotics (1930) ===
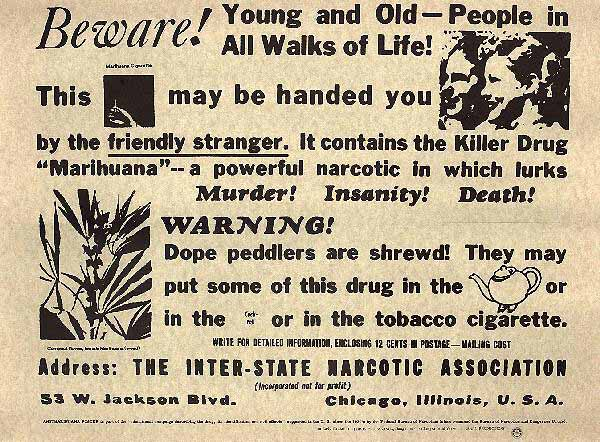
Federal Bureau of Narcotics public service announcement used in the late 1930s and 1940s

In 1930, President Herbert Hoover organized the Federal Bureau of Narcotics within the United States Department of the Treasury to coordinate the federal response to narcotic drugs. Under Commissioner Harry J. Anslinger, the government pressured state governments to adopt the Uniform Law Commission's Uniform State Narcotic Drug Act, a model act for states to regulate the production and sale of narcotic drugs beyond existing federal laws by using their police powers. By the mid-1930s, all states implemented some regulation of cannabis. Anslinger also used his position to warn that cannabis promoted irrational, sexual, and violent behavior, producing propaganda films to spread his views.

=== 1936 Geneva Trafficking Conventions ===
In 1936, the Convention for the Suppression of the Illicit Traffic in Dangerous Drugs was concluded in Geneva, Switzerland. Anslinger led the American delegation in seeking criminalization of cultivation, production, manufacture, and distribution of opium, coca, and cannabis (including their derivatives) for non-medical and non-scientific purposes. However, Article 2 of the Convention only requested signatory countries to use their national criminal law systems to severely punish drug trafficking. The American government refused to sign the final version because it considered the convention too weak, especially in relation to extradition, extraterritoriality, and confiscation of trafficking profits.

=== Marihuana Tax Act (1937) ===
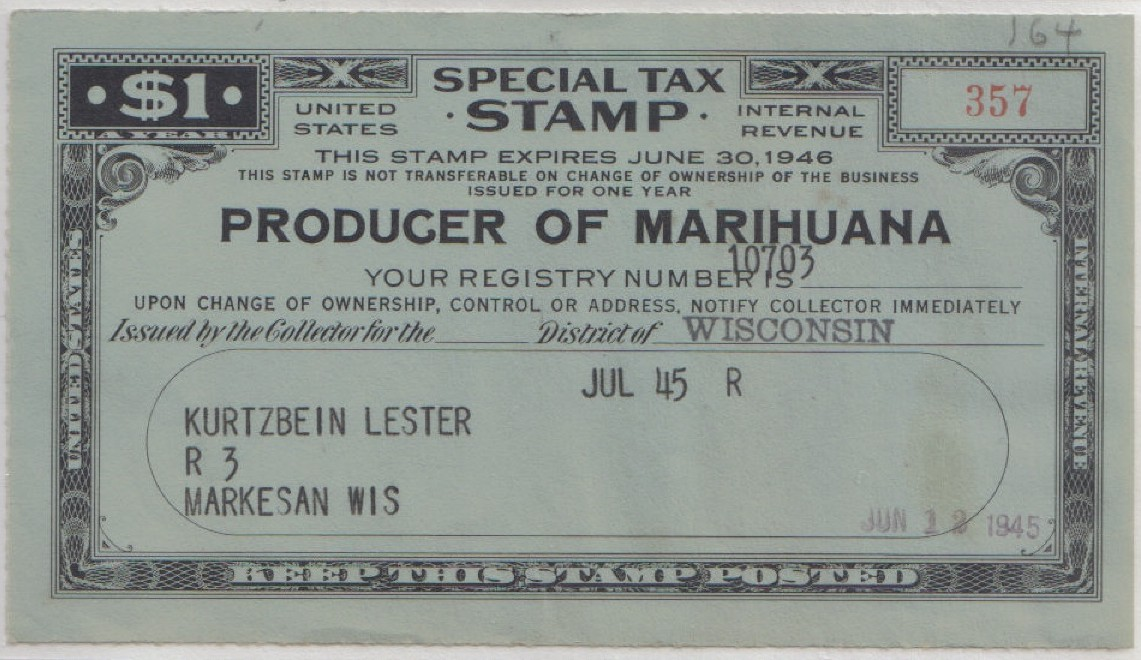
Tax stamp for a producer of hemp

In 1936, the Federal Bureau of Narcotics lobbied Congress to pass the Marihuana Tax Act of 1937 in response to rising rates of marijuana smoking. Newspaper mogul William Randolph Hearst had heavily invested in timber to procure wood pulp for his publications, but the 1933 invention of the decorticator threatened to turn hemp fiber into a cheaper alternative. In response, his empire of newspapers used the "yellow journalism" pioneered by Hearst to demonize the cannabis plant and claim that it caused violent crime. Additionally, United States Secretary of the Treasury Andrew Mellon held shares of DuPont whose invention of nylon was threatened by the growth of hemp, raising conflict-of-interest concerns.

By imposing an excise tax on hemp sales that was much lower for medical and industrial uses, the law dramatically reduced the availability of recreational cannabis. Annual fees were $24 ($537.50 in 2025) for importers, manufacturers, and cultivators of cannabis, $1 ($22.40 in 2025) for medical and research purposes, and $3 ($67.19 in 2025) for industrial users. Detailed sales logs were required to record marijuana sales. Selling marijuana to any person who had previously paid the annual fee incurred a tax of $1 per ounce or fraction thereof; however, the tax was $100 ($2,240 in 2025) per ounce or fraction thereof to sell any person who had not registered and paid the annual fee.Marihuana Tax Act of 1937 (Pub. L. 75-238). Stat. Vol. 50. 1937. 551. The American Medical Association (AMA) opposed the act because the tax was imposed on physicians prescribing cannabis, retail pharmacists selling cannabis, and medical cannabis cultivation and manufacturing. The AMA unsuccessfully sought to instead add cannabis to drugs regulated by the Harrison Narcotics Tax Act, which regulated opium and coca.

Hemp for Victory, a short documentary produced by the United States Department of Agriculture during World War II to inform and encourage farmers to grow hemp

After the Imperial Japanese Army defeated American forces in their 1941–42 Philippines campaign, the federal government urged American farms to cultivate 400,000 acres of hemp by 1945 for fiber production by issuing tax stamps. In 1957, the last commercial hemp was grown in Wisconsin.

In 1939, New York City Mayor Fiorello La Guardia organized a committee within the New York Academy of Medicine to study the health effects and regulation of cannabis. The resulting 1944 LaGuardia Committee report questioned the federal government's claims that marijuana was addictive and had a gateway drug effect to stronger narcotics. As THC was not isolated from cannabis until 1964, the Federal Bureau of Narcotics' testing for the psychoactive effect of hemp strains was inconsistent.

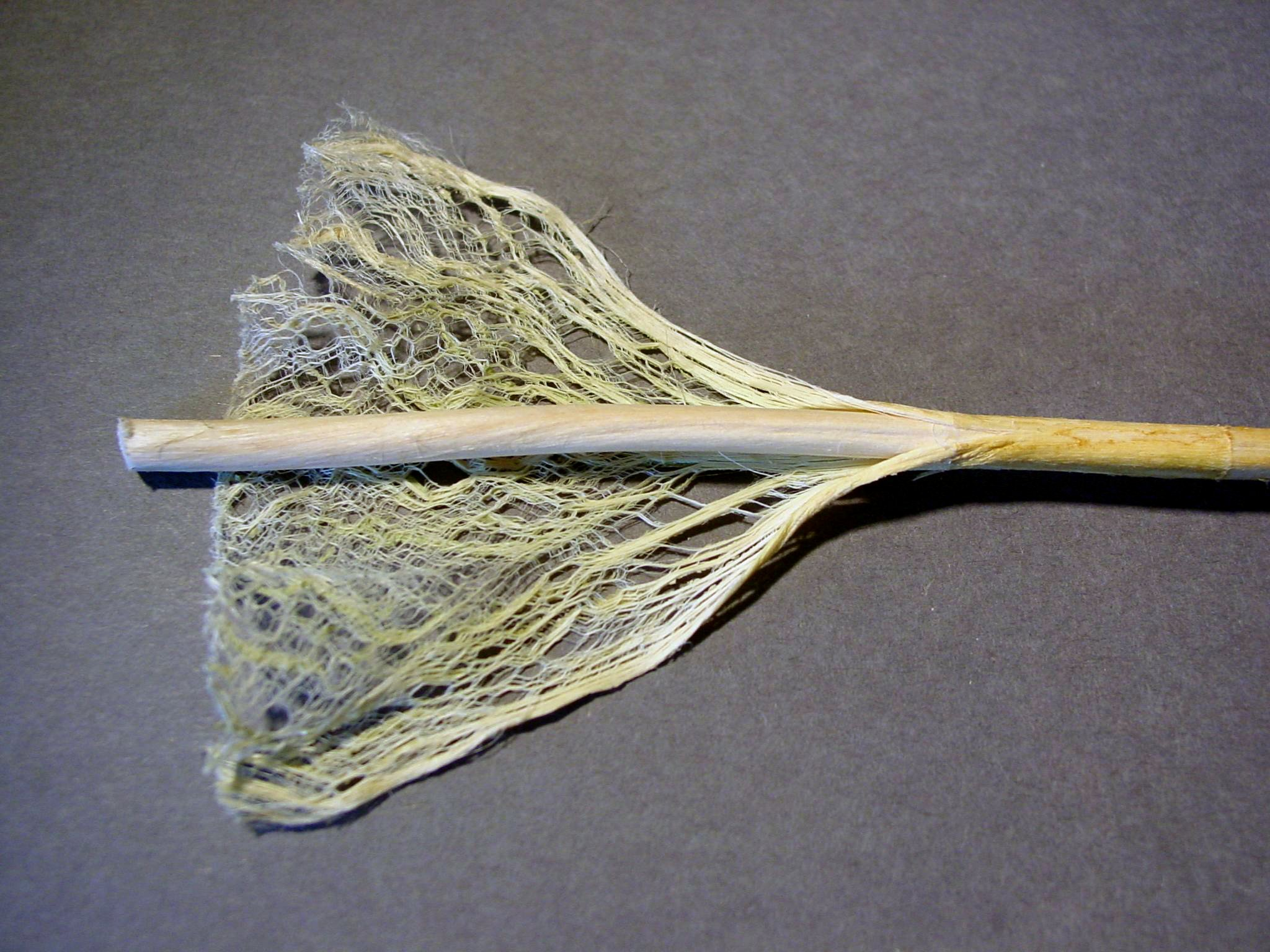
Hemp, bast with fibers. The stem in the middle.

=== Mandatory sentencing (1952, 1956) ===
The Boggs Act of 1951 introduced mandatory sentencing for drug convictions, while the Narcotics Control Act of 1956 increased the penalties for cannabis possession. Based on testimony from the Federal Bureau of Narcotics that the Harrison Narcotics Tax Act had dramatically reduced the number of Americans facing drug addiction, the Narcotics Control Act of 1956 added penalties for all violations of the Marihuana Tax Act.

=== Controlled Substances Act (1970) ===
In Leary v. United States (1968), the Supreme Court of the United States struck down the Marihuana Tax Act as unconstitutional, since it violated the Fifth Amendment right against self-incrimination. In response, Congress passed the Controlled Substances Act (CSA) as Title II of the Comprehensive Drug Abuse Prevention and Control Act of 1970. Although the new law prohibited the use of cannabis for any purpose under a Schedule I classification, it eliminated the Boggs Act's mandatory minimum sentences and reduced simple drug possession from a felony to a misdemeanor. All efforts to reschedule cannabis have thus far failed.

=== Reorganization (1968, 1973) ===
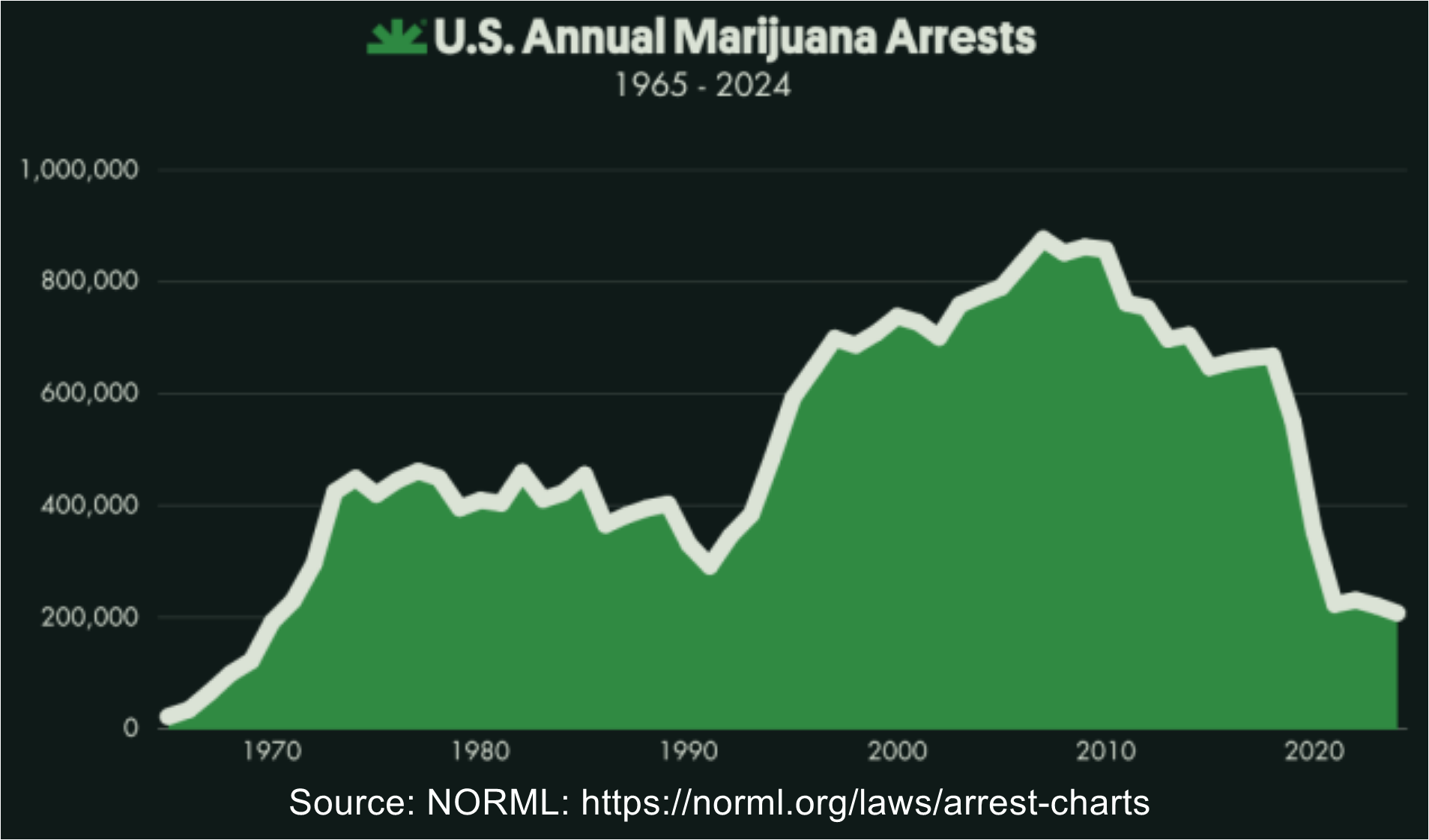
Annual marijuana arrests in the United States (1965–2014; NORML).

In 1968, the Federal Bureau of Narcotics and Bureau of Drug Abuse Control merged to create the Bureau of Narcotics and Dangerous Drugs as a United States Department of Justice subsidiary. In 1973, President Richard Nixon convinced Congress to further merge that agency and the Office of Drug Abuse Law Enforcement to create the Drug Enforcement Administration (DEA).

=== Mandatory sentencing and three-strikes (1984–1994) ===
During the Reagan administration, the Sentencing Reform Act provisions of the Comprehensive Crime Control Act of 1984 created the Sentencing Commission to establish mandatory sentencing guidelines. However, in United States v. Booker (2005), the Supreme Court held that under the Sixth Amendment, the Sentencing Commission only has the power to issue advisory guidelines.

The Anti-Drug Abuse Act of 1986 reinstated mandatory prison sentences, including for large-scale cannabis distribution. The Anti-Drug Abuse Act of 1988 amended the Controlled Substances Act to authorize the death penalty for members of criminal organizations who plan or participate in murder. The Violent Crime Control and Law Enforcement Act of 1994 added a three-strikes law, which mandated life imprisonment for someone convicted of a serious violent felony if they were previously convicted of two other serious violent felonies or one such crime and a serious drug offense.

=== Solomon–Lautenberg amendment (1990) ===
The 1990 Solomon–Lautenberg amendment requires state governments to suspend the driver's license of anyone who commits a drug offense, notify the Secretary of Transportation of their opposition to such a policy, or accept reductions in federal highway funding. While most states chose to enact a policy of license suspension regardless of whether the drug offense occurred in a motor vehicle, all except Alabama, Arkansas, and Florida have subsequently repealed such state laws.

=== California Proposition 215 (1996) ===
The 1996 voter approval of California Proposition 215 permitted medical cannabis in the California Health and Safety Code. In response, the U.S. House of Representatives approved House Joint Resolution 117 in September 1998 to criticize state circumvention of the federal Controlled Substances Act and FDA drug approval process. In January 1998, the federal government sued the Oakland Cannabis Buyers' Cooperative for violating the CSA. In United States v. Oakland Cannabis Buyers' Cooperative (2001), the Supreme Court held that the common law medical necessity defense was statutorily abrogated by the CSA, which allowed the federal government to continue enforcing the CSA in California.

=== Gonzales v. Raich (2005) ===
In Gonzales v. Raich (2005), the Supreme Court upheld the federal government's authority to criminalize homegrown medical cannabis through the Controlled Substances Act based on its Commerce Clause authority. In a 6–3 decision, the Supreme Court opined that protecting local cultivation of cannabis may have a "substantial impact on the interstate market for this extraordinarily popular substance."

== Decriminalization (1970s–) ==
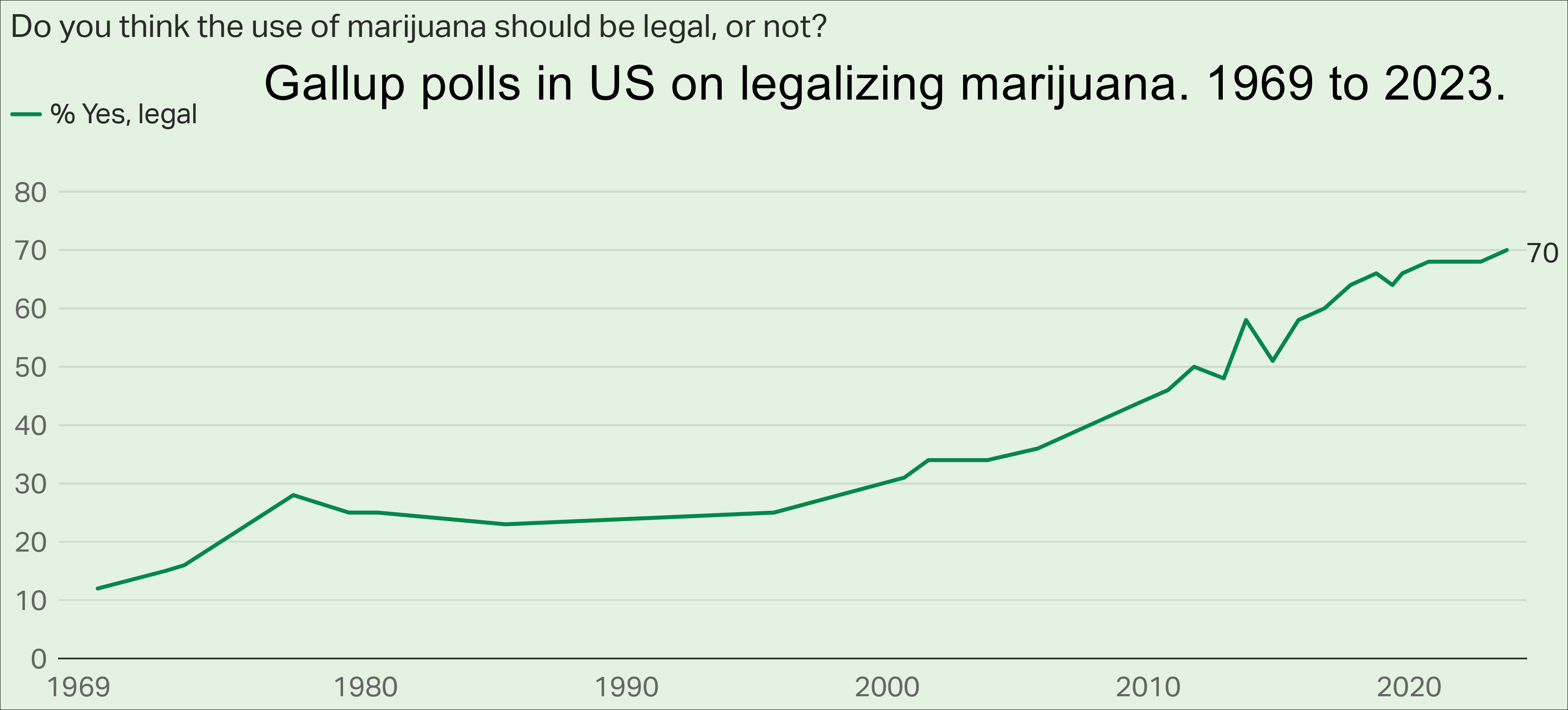
Timeline of Gallup polls on American support for legalizing marijuana. See data table below.

Gallup Polls: Do you think the use of marijuana should be legal, or not?
Date	Legal (%)
10/2/2023	70
10/3/2022	68
10/1/2021	68
10/1/2020	68
10/1/2019	66
5/15/2019	64
10/1/2018	66
10/5/2017	64
10/5/2016	60
10/7/2015	58
10/12/2014	51
10/3/2013	58
11/26/2012	48
10/6/2011	50
10/7/2010	46
10/1/2009	44
10/13/2005	36
11/10/2003	34
8/3/2001	34
8/29/2000	31
8/28/1995	25
5/17/1985	23
6/27/1980	25
5/18/1979	25
4/1/1977	28
1/26/1973	16
5/3/1972	15
10/2/1969	12

=== Medical use ===
==== Compassionate IND program (1978) ====
In 1975, a Washington, D.C., resident named Robert C. Randall was arrested for cultivating cannabis. Randall, who had discovered that cannabis relieved the symptoms of his glaucoma, employed a medical necessity defense at trial to justify his use of the drug. The charges against Randall were dismissed, and as a result of an ensuing petition filed with the FDA, Randall became the first person to receive cannabis from the federal government in 1976. After his supply was cut off in 1978, Randall filed a lawsuit to have it restored, prompting the FDA to create the Compassionate Investigational New Drug program shortly thereafter. The program allowed patients with serious medical conditions to receive a regular supply of cannabis from the federal government; however, only 13 patients ended up participating due to the complicated application process.

The Compassionate IND program was closed to new patients in 1992 due to a flood of applications from HIV/AIDS patients and concerns that the program undercut President George H. W. Bush's efforts to discourage illegal drug use. Twenty-eight applications that had recently been approved were rescinded, and only the 13 patients who were already receiving cannabis were allowed to do so moving forward. All but two of the patients have since died; the surviving two patients are the only people who currently receive cannabis through the program.

==== Early medical cannabis laws (1978–1982) ====
In 1978, New Mexico was the first state to address medical cannabis, and by the end of 1982, over thirty states had legislated on this topic. The majority of these laws sought to provide cannabis through federal National Institute on Drug Abuse programs administered by the states. However, only seven states ended up implementing such programs due to the large bureaucratic and regulatory obstacles involved. Other states passed laws reclassifying cannabis' state scheduling or allowing doctors to prescribe cannabis. Additionally, a few states affirmed a medical defense to drug use and possession charges in state court. These laws were largely ineffectual due to the continued federal prohibition of medical cannabis. By the mid-1980s, efforts to pass new medical cannabis laws stalled, and many existing protections were either repealed or allowed to expire.

==== DEA judge recommends reclassification (1988) ====
In 1972, the National Organization for the Reform of Marijuana Laws (NORML) petitioned the Bureau of Narcotics and Dangerous Drugs to reschedule cannabis for medical use. After a decade of legal battles in which the DEA refused to consider the petition, public hearings were finally began in 1986. In September 1988, DEA Chief Administrative Law Judge Francis L. Young ruled that failure to reclassify cannabis to Schedule II would be arbitrary and capricious because "marijuana, in its natural form, is one of the safest therapeutically active substances known to man." However, DEA Administrator John C. Lawn rejected Young's non-binding recommendation in December 1989, and in 1994, the Court of Appeals for the D.C. Circuit upheld that decision based on Chevron deference.

==== Proposition P and first cannabis dispensaries (1991) ====
In 1991, 79% of San Francisco voters approved Proposition P, a non-binding ballot measure expressing support for the medical use of cannabis. Mary Jane Rathbun, better known as Brownie Mary, had dramatically raised support for medical cannabis through her distribution of cannabis-infused brownies to the San Francisco General Hospital's HIV/AIDS patients.

The San Francisco Board of Supervisors soon followed with Resolution 141–92, which urged law enforcement not to prosecute individuals using medical cannabis with physician documentation. The resolution enabled the open sale of cannabis to HIV/AIDS patients and others within the city, most notably through the San Francisco Cannabis Buyers Club operated by Dennis Peron. Similar clubs appeared outside San Francisco in the ensuing years as other cities passed legislation to support the medical use of cannabis. For example, the Wo/Men's Alliance for Medical Marijuana was founded in 1993 after Santa Cruz voters approved Measure A in November 1992, while the Oakland Cannabis Buyers' Cooperative was founded in 1995 shortly before the Oakland City Council passed multiple medical cannabis resolutions.

==== Compassionate Use Act of 1996 ====
In California, medical cannabis advocates expanded on their local success by lobbying for medical cannabis bills in 1994 and 1995. However, Governor Pete Wilson vetoed both bills passed by the California State Legislature. In response, advocates gathered 775,000 signatures for qualification of a statewide ballot initiative in 1996. On November 5, 1996, California voters approved Proposition 215 with 56% support (Compassionate Use Act of 1996) as the first state to legalize use, possession, and cultivation of cannabis with a physician's recommendation for treatment of any illness for which marijuana provides relief. The law also allowed patient caregivers to cultivate cannabis, and it urged lawmakers to facilitate the "safe and affordable distribution of marijuana".

In 1998, Washington, Oregon, Alaska, Nevada, and the District of Columbia passed ballot measures supporting medical cannabis. Maine followed in 1999, along with Nevada (for a second time) and Colorado in 2000. Also in 2000, Hawaii became the first state to legalize medical cannabis through an act of its state legislature.

==== D.C. medical cannabis approved (1998) ====
In 1998, Washington, D.C., residents approved Initiative 59 to legalize use of medical cannabis, but U.S. Representative Bob Barr spurred Congress into preventing its implementation for over a decade. The initial Barr amendment was enacted prior to the November 1998 election but after ballots had been printed, thereby allowing D.C. residents to vote on the initiative but preventing the results from being made public. The amendment was challenged in court by the American Civil Liberties Union as a violation of the First Amendment, and in September 1999, U.S. District Court Judge Richard W. Roberts agreed. Barr then introduced a similar amendment, which became law in November 1999. After leaving Congress in 2003, Barr began supporting medical cannabis and convinced Congress to remove the amendment from annual D.C. appropriations bills, allowing implementation of the 1998 ballot initiative in December 2009.

==== Conant v. Walters (2000) ====
After California's Proposition 215 passed, the Clinton administration reiterated its firm opposition to medical cannabis by threatening to revoke the prescription-writing abilities of doctors who recommended or prescribed the drug through criminal prosecution and bans from participating in Medicare and Medicaid. A group of physicians challenged this policy in Conant v. Walters as a violation of the First Amendment, and they prevailed with a judgement affirming their right to recommend cannabis, even as prescriptions remain federally illegal under the CSA.

==== Ogden memo (2009) ====
In October 2009, the Justice Department issued the Ogden memo, advising United States attorneys to not prosecute medical cannabis providers for violating the CSA. Federal prosecutors were instructed to only investigate other federal crimes, such as money laundering and illegal use of firearms. While decriminalization advocates initially praised the policy, raids on medical cannabis providers actually increased following the Ogden memo. In June 2011, Deputy Attorney General James M. Cole created further confusion by re-approving enforcement of the CSA against medical cannabis providers.

==== Rohrabacher–Farr amendment (2014) ====
Since December 2014, Congress has included the Rohrabacher–Farr amendment in its annual appropriations to prohibit the Justice Department from interfering with state-level legalization of medical cannabis. The Justice Department initially continued its raids on medical cannabis providers by claiming that the amendment only blocked the agency from prosecuting state officials. However, multiple judges rejected that interpretation as violating the statute's plain meaning, so the Justice Department has since accepted state legalization of medical cannabis as a permissible violation of the CSA.

==== Medical Marijuana and Cannabidiol Research Expansion Act (2022) ====
In December 2022, President Joe Biden signed the Medical Marijuana and Cannabidiol Research Expansion Act into law, the first standalone cannabis reform bill enacted at the federal level. The bill expedited approval for cannabis research and production of cannabis for research purposes while requiring the Department of Health and Human Services to investigate the medical utility of cannabis and barriers to conducting research. The act also ordered the Attorney General to conduct annual reviews to ensure that cannabis is being adequately produced for research purposes and clarified that it "shall not be a violation of the Controlled Substances Act for a State-licensed physician to discuss the currently known potential harms and benefits of marijuana [...] as a treatment with the patient," among other reforms.

==== DEA proposes reclassification to Schedule III (2024) ====
President Biden Discusses Taking the Next Step to Reclassify Marijuana (0:45)
Joe Biden speaks about his administration's approach to marijuana and its proposed reclassification.

In October 2022, Biden announced that he would ask the Secretary of Health and Human Services and Attorney General to review cannabis' drug scheduling. In August 2023, following a FDA review, the Department of Health and Human Services issued a recommendation for the DEA to reclassify cannabis in Schedule III. In April 2024, the DEA confirmed its intention to reclassify cannabis as a Schedule III drug, pending review by the Office of Management and Budget, a public comment period, and review by an administrative law judge. Years of delay by DEA caused this rulemaking to never reach a final conclusion.

President Trump signed Executive Order 14370 on December 18, 2025 requiring DEA to expedite their rescheduling. After months of subsequent inaction, on April 22, 2026, Acting Attorney General Todd Blanche issued a Department of Justice order to reschedule medical cannabis products to schedule III. Those products must be either FDA-approved or state-regulated. The earlier rescheduling process was canceled by DEA, and a rescheduling of other categories of cannabis products (particularly for recreational adult use) was ordered to take place in June.

=== Non-medical use ===
==== Shafer Commission (1972) ====
Part F of the CSA authorized the Shafer Commission to study rising cannabis use and make policy recommendations. Led by former Pennsylvania governor Raymond P. Shafer, the commission's March 1972 report found that the societal harms caused by cannabis were limited, recommending removal of criminal penalties for possession and distribution of small amounts of the drug. Although no federal reforms resulted, the report's findings helped influence the passage of decriminalization laws in a number of states during the 1970s.

==== California Marijuana Initiative (1972) ====
In 1972, California's Proposition 19 was the first ballot measure attempting to legalize all use, possession, and cultivation of cannabis, while leaving commercial sale impermissible. Though the measure was defeated by a wide margin (33–67%), its supporters were encouraged by the results, providing momentum to other reform efforts in California.

==== First wave of decriminalization (1973–1978) ====
In 1973, Oregon became the first state to decriminalize cannabis, reducing the penalty for up to one ounce to a $100 fine. States that decriminalized in the following years were: Alaska (1975), Maine (1975), Colorado (1975), California (1975), Ohio (1975), Minnesota (1976), Mississippi (1977), New York (1977), North Carolina (1977), and Nebraska (1978). NORML was actively involved in helping to pass these laws, lobbying in support of legislation and paying for decriminalization proponents (including members of the Shafer Commission) to travel to various states to testify.

Some cities also passed decriminalization laws in the 1970s, such as Ann Arbor in 1972 and Madison in 1977. Additionally, San Francisco voters approved a non-binding measure in 1978 to effectively legalize cannabis, but Mayor George Moscone was assassinated shortly afterwards and the initiative was subsequently disregarded.

==== Ravin v. State (1975) ====
Ravin v. State was a 1975 decision by the Alaska Supreme Court that the state constitution's right to privacy protects an adult's ability to possess and use a small amount of cannabis within the home for personal use. The Alaska Supreme Court thereby became the first—and only—state or federal court to announce a constitutional privacy right that protects some level of cannabis use and possession. This policy of effective legalization remained in place until it was overridden by the 1990 Alaska Measure 2, which recriminalized cannabis in the state. After the 1980 United States elections delivered massive state and federal gains for the Republican Party, the party delivered on its anti-drug platform by re-criminalizing possession of marijuana in all states except Alaska by 1983, reversing the first wave of non-medical cannabis decriminalization.

==== Second wave of decriminalization (2000s–) ====
In 2001, Nevada became the first state in over two decades to decriminalize cannabis. In the following years, major cities across the U.S. began to either decriminalize cannabis or make enforcement of cannabis laws the lowest priority. Among the first cities to do so were Seattle (2003), Oakland (2004), Denver (2005), and San Francisco (2006). The trend continued with Massachusetts decriminalizing in 2008, followed by Connecticut (2011), Rhode Island (2012), Vermont (2013), the District of Columbia (2014), Maryland (2014), Missouri (2014), the U.S. Virgin Islands (2014), Delaware (2015), Illinois (2016), and New Hampshire (2017), New Mexico (2019), North Dakota (2019), Hawaii (2019), and Virginia (2020).

==== First two states legalize (2012) ====
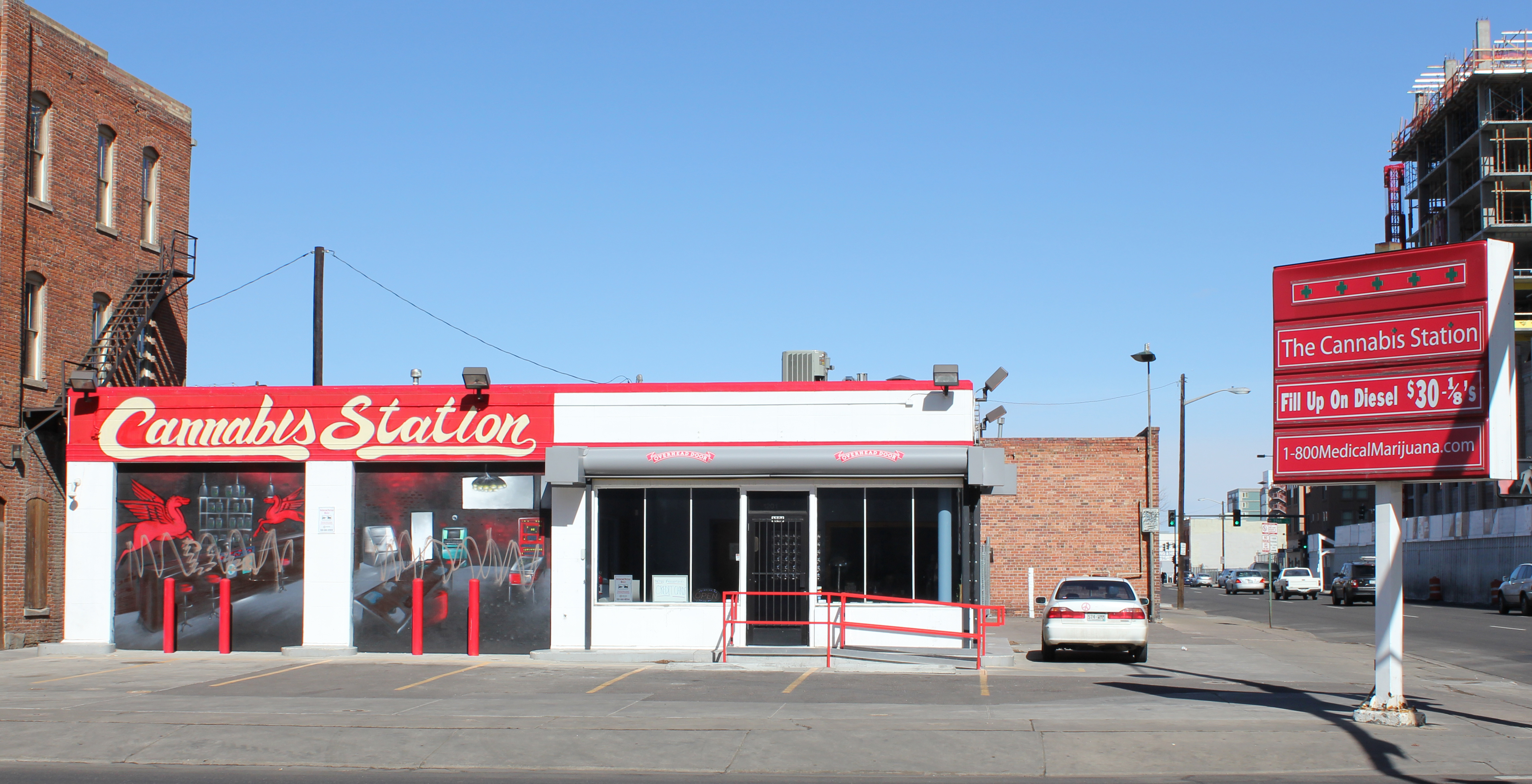
Cannabis dispensary in Denver, Colorado (2012)

On November 6, 2012, Colorado and Washington became the first states to legalize recreational use of cannabis when voters approved Colorado Amendment 64 and Washington Initiative 502. Each regulated cannabis by allowing possession of up to an ounce for adults ages 21 and older, while imposing drug-impaired driving provisions similar to those against drunk driving. Unlike Initiative 502, Amendment 64 allowed for personal cultivation of up to six plants. Both allowed for commercial cultivation and sales, subject to regulation and taxes.

==== Cole Memorandum (2013) ====
In response to state-level legalization of recreational cannabis in violation of the Controlled Substances Act, the Justice Department issued the Cole Memorandum in August 2013. Named after Deputy Attorney General James M. Cole, the memo clarified that the federal government would limit its enforcement in such states to eight types of cases, such as distribution of cannabis to minors and diversion of cannabis across state borders. In January 2018, Attorney General Jeff Sessions officially rescinded the Cole Memorandum, but pressure from Colorado Senator Cory Gardner convinced President Donald Trump to continue its policy.

==== Ballot measure legalization (2014–2024) ====
In November 2014, the states of Alaska (Measure 2) and Oregon (Ballot Measure 91) along with Washington, D.C., (Initiative 71) legalized the recreational use of cannabis. These laws were similar to those of Colorado and Washington, except that the D.C. initiative did not allow for commercial sales. A rider attached to the 2014 "Cromnibus" bill further prevented the Council of the District of Columbia from allowing commercial sales.

In November 2016, the number of legal states doubled as four more states passed ballot measures to legalize cannabis: California, Nevada, Massachusetts, and Maine. This included the nation's most populous state (California), while Massachusetts and Maine became the first eastern states to legalize. In 2018, Michigan voters approved a ballot measure to legalize recreational cannabis.

In November 2020, four states voted to legalize recreational cannabis via ballot measures: Arizona, Montana, New Jersey, and South Dakota. However, the South Dakota Amendment A was overturned for violating the state's single-subject rule because it would have simultaneous legalized medical and non-medical use of cannabis and hemp. In 2022, Maryland and Missouri legalized recreational cannabis via ballot measures, followed by Ohio in 2023.

==== Indian Reservation legalization allowed (2014) ====
In December 2014, the Justice Department began allowing recognized Indian tribes to legalize the use and sale of cannabis on American Indian reservations. Reservation laws became permitted to differ from state and federal laws as long as strict controls are maintained. In 2015, the Flandreau Santee Sioux Tribe of South Dakota voted to legalize the recreational use of cannabis. Others such as Yakama Nation and the Oglala Sioux Tribal Council have rejected legalization on their reservations.

==== Legislative legalization (2018–2025) ====
In January 2018, Vermont became the first state to legalize non-medical cannabis through an act of legislature, as opposed to the previous eight states' use of ballot initiatives. Additionally, the bill signed by Republican governor Phil Scott does not allow for commercial sale, though it authorized a commission to explore that option. In June 2019, Illinois became the second state to legalize through an act of legislature and the first to legalize commercial sale in this way. The bill was signed into law by Gov. J. B. Pritzker after passing the State House 66–47 and the State Senate 38–17.

In 2021, New York, New Mexico, Connecticut, and Virginia legislatively legalized recreational cannabis, followed by Rhode Island in 2022 and Delaware and Minnesota in 2023. However, as of September 2025, Virginia is still yet to license cannabis retailers.

==== Agriculture Improvement Act of 2018 ====
The Agriculture Improvement Act of 2018 legalized production of hemp with low levels of delta-9-THC. It may have inadvertently allowed cultivation of hemp plants with high levels of delta-8-THC, which is also psychoactive and has since become more popular for recreational use across the U.S.

==== House approves MORE Act (2020) ====
On December 4, 2020, the House of Representatives voted 228–164 to approve the Marijuana Opportunity Reinvestment and Expungement Act, the first time that either chamber of Congress had voted to legalize cannabis at the federal level. The act would have also expunged cannabis offenses for non-violent offenders and imposed a federal cannabis tax to fund restorative justice programs. The act did not receive a vote in the Senate, lapsing at the end of the 116th United States Congress. In the following session, the House once again passed the bill without Senate support.

==== Presidential pardon (2022) ====
In October 2022, President Biden pardoned all people convicted of simple possession of cannabis in federal court and in the District of Columbia. In December 2023, Biden also pardoned other offenses, such as attempted possession and use of cannabis.

== Legalization timeline ==
United States jurisdictions with legalized recreational cannabis
Jurisdiction	Effective date	Licensed sales since	Legalization method
Washington (state)	December 6, 2012	July 8, 2014	Initiated ballot measure
Colorado	December 10, 2012	January 1, 2014	Initiated ballot measure
Alaska	February 24, 2015	October 29, 2016	Initiated ballot measure
Washington, D.C.	February 26, 2015	Never authorized	Initiated ballot measure
Oregon	July 1, 2015	October 1, 2015	Initiated ballot measure
California	November 9, 2016	January 1, 2018	Initiated ballot measure
Massachusetts	December 15, 2016	November 20, 2018	Initiated ballot measure
Nevada	January 1, 2017	July 1, 2017	Initiated ballot measure
Maine	January 30, 2017	October 9, 2020	Initiated ballot measure
Vermont	July 1, 2018	October 1, 2022	Legislative bill
Northern Mariana Islands	September 21, 2018	July 16, 2021	Legislative bill
Michigan	December 6, 2018	December 1, 2019	Initiated ballot measure
Guam	April 4, 2019	Not yet started	Legislative bill
Illinois	January 1, 2020	January 1, 2020	Legislative bill
Arizona	November 30, 2020	January 22, 2021	Initiated ballot measure
Montana	January 1, 2021	January 1, 2022	Initiated ballot measure
New Jersey	February 22, 2021	April 21, 2022	Legislatively referred ballot measure
New York	March 31, 2021	December 29, 2022	Legislative bill
New Mexico	June 29, 2021	April 1, 2022	Legislative bill
Connecticut	July 1, 2021	January 10, 2023	Legislative bill
Virginia	July 1, 2021	July 1, 2027	Legislative bill
Rhode Island	May 25, 2022	December 1, 2022	Legislative bill
Missouri	December 8, 2022	February 3, 2023	Initiated ballot measure
United States Virgin Islands	January 18, 2023	Not yet started	Legislative bill
Delaware	April 23, 2023	August 1, 2025	Legislative bill
Maryland	July 1, 2023	July 1, 2023	Legislatively referred ballot measure
Minnesota	August 1, 2023	September 16, 2025	Legislative bill
Ohio	December 7, 2023	August 6, 2024	Initiated ballot measure

== See also ==
- Cannabis in the United States
- Timeline of cannabis laws in the United States
- History of cannabis
- Single Convention on Narcotic Drugs
- SAFE Banking Act

== Works cited ==
- Dufton, Emily (December 5, 2017). Grass Roots: The Rise and Fall and Rise of Marijuana in America. Basic Books. ISBN 978-0-465-09616-9.
