= List of 2019 United States cannabis reform proposals =

- 2018 ← → 2020
- Legality of cannabis in the United States (2023)
- Status: Legal for recreational use Legal for medical use Illegal

In 2019, twenty seven U.S. states proposed cannabis reform legislation for medical marijuana and non-medical adult use. State-level legalization remains at odds with cannabis' status as a Schedule I narcotic under the Controlled Substances Act at the Federal level.

Major publications predicted several state legislatures would propose legislation in 2019, or voters would do so directly via initiative. These included Connecticut, Hawaii, Minnesota, New Hampshire, New Jersey, New Mexico, New York, Rhode Island and Illinois. Ohio Marijuana Legalization Initiative (filed in 2018) may appear on the 2019 ballot.

== Legislation and initiatives passed in 2019 ==
- Delaware Senate Substitute 1 for Senate Bill 37 (SB 37), expungement of one cannabis related felony or misdemeanor, became law June 30
- Georgia HB 324, allowing medical cannabis to be grown and sold (ratified by governor April 17)
- Hawaii HB 1383, decriminalization (passed state House of Representatives March 7, amended bill passed Senate April 9, reconciled April 26)
- Illinois Cannabis Regulation and Tax Act (Illinois House Bill 1438), legalization and regulation; passed by state legislature on May 31. Effective January 1, 2020.
- New Mexico Senate Bill 323, decriminalization
- North Dakota HB 1050, partial decriminalization (criminal infraction without jail)
- Texas HB 3703, expansion of medical cannabis program qualifying conditions
- Texas HB 1325, legalized hemp

== Legislation and initiatives introduced in 2019 ==
=== State ===
State	Title	Detail
Arkansas	HB 1972	Arkansas HB 1972, proposed decriminalization
Alabama	SB98	Alabama SB98, proposed decriminalization (approved by Senate Judiciary Committee)
Arizona	Proposition 207	Arizona Proposition 207, Smart and Safe Arizona Act: a legalization initiative on the 2020 ballot
Connecticut	House Bill 7371	Connecticut House Bill 7371, proposed legalization and regulation, and SB 1085, legalizing possession, and expunging past convictions (approved by finance, general law, and judiciary committees)
Delaware	HB 110	Delaware HB 110 legalization (approved by House Revenue & Finance Committee June 5)
Florida		Florida initiatives for 2020; Regulate Marijuana in a Manner Similar to Alcohol, sponsored by Sensible Florida, is a proposed constitutional amendment. The state supreme court took up a review of whether the initiative was compliant with legal requirements in September.; The Florida Marijuana Legalization and Medical Marijuana Treatment Center Sales Initiative, sponsored by Make It Legal Florida, is also a constitutional amendment that would allow non-medical sales through the retail points authorized by Florida Amendment 2 in 2016. It gathered 100,000 signatures in 20 days.
Hawaii		Hawaii SB 686, proposed legalization
Idaho		Idaho hemp and medical cannabis initiative (filed): Idaho medical cannabis initiative filed with Secretary of State July 3; Louisiana House Bill 509, proposed legalization and regulation
Missouri	HB 1095	Missouri HB 1095, proposed decriminalization
New Hampshire	House Bill 481	New Hampshire House Bill 481, proposed legalization (passed House of Representatives April 4)
New Jersey		New Jersey Cannabis Regulatory and Expungement Aid Modernization Act, proposed legalization and regulation, to become 2020 voter referendum: New Jersey A-5325, proposed decriminalization (passed appropriations committee on May 20)
New Mexico	House Bill 356	New Mexico House Bill 356, proposed legalization and regulation (failed): New Mexico Governor's working group proposal (October 16, for January 2020 session) – legalization and expungement
New York	New York Marijuana Regulation and Taxation Act (S1527/A1617), legalization and regulation	
Pennsylvania	H.B. 1899	Pennsylvania H.B. 1899, adult use legalization and sales through state liquor stores; introduced October 1, 2019: Pennsylvania H.B. 350, adult use and expungement
South Dakota		South Dakota constitutional amendment petition, proposed legalization and regulation (cleared by Secretary of State September 11, 2019, over 50,000 voter signatures submitted on November 4); South Dakota Initiated Measure 26, approved for 2020 ballot on December 19, 2019
Texas	House Bill 63	Texas House Bill 63, proposed decriminalization (passed Criminal Jurisprudence Committee on March 25, passed in House of Representatives April 29)
Virginia	House Bill 2371	Virginia House Bill 2371 proposed legalization; it was defeated in the Courts of Justice committee.

=== Federal ===
- Marijuana Freedom and Opportunity Act, would deschedule cannabis, cosponsored by Chuck Schumer
- SAFE Banking Act, moved out of committee and placed on Union Calendar June 6
- STATES Act
- FY2020 spending bill rider, recognizing state-legal cannabis passed in House on June 20, 267 to 165
- Marijuana Opportunity Reinvestment and Expungement (MORE) Act introduced in Congress by House Judiciary Committee chairman Jerry Nadler and Presidential candidate Senator Kamala Harris, would provide for de-scheduling, federal legalization and expungement
- Marijuana Justice Act
- Ending Federal Marijuana Prohibition Act
