= List of South Dakota ballot measures =

The following is a list of statewide initiatives and referendums modifying state law and proposing state constitutional amendments in South Dakota, sorted by election.

== 2000s ==
=== 2000 ===
| Measure name | Description | Status | Yes votes | No votes |
|---|---|---|---|---|
| Amendment A | A constitutional amendment relating to the classification of property for purposes of taxation. | Passed | 167,117 (54.94%) | 137,081 (45.06%) |
| Amendment B | An constitutional amendment authorizing local initiatives to provide for the cooperation and organization of local government. | Passed | 165,346 (55.28%) | 133,780 (44.72%) |
| Amendment C | An initiated constitutional amendment repealing the state inheritance tax and prohibiting the legislature from imposing an inheritance tax. | Passed | 251,316 (80.13%) | 62,334 (19.87%) |
| Amendment D | An initiated constitutional amendment repealing the video lottery. | Failed | 146,428 (46.33%) | 169,642 (53.67%) |
| Amendment E | An constitutional amendment permitting the investment of permanent school funds in certain stocks, bonds, mutual funds, and other financial instruments and to use a certain portion of the interest and income to increase the principal in the fund. | Passed | 168,896 (56.10%) | 132,181 (43.90%) |
| Initiated Measure 1 | An initiative raising the maximum bet limits for limited card games and slot machines authorized within the city of Deadwood. | Passed | 161,249 (51.60%) | 151,244 (48.40%) |

=== 2001 ===
| Measure name | Description | Status | Yes votes | No votes |
|---|---|---|---|---|
| Amendment A | A constitutional amendment authorizing the creation and administration of a trust fund for the proceeds of the sale of the state cement plant. | Passed | 69,309 (78.79%) | 18,657 (21.21%) |
| Amendment B | An constitutional amendment authorizing the creation and administration of trust funds for health care and education. | Passed | 63,484 (72.50%) | 24,086 (27.50%) |

=== 2002 ===
==== June 2002 ====
| Measure name | Description | Status | Yes votes | No votes |
|---|---|---|---|---|
| Amendment A | A constitutional amendment repealing 1998 Amendment E, which prohibited corporate farming. | Failed | 83,320 (46.01%) | 97,755 (53.99%) |

==== November 2002 ====
| Measure name | Description | Status | Yes votes | No votes |
|---|---|---|---|---|
| Amendment A | A constitutional amendment relating to the rights of a criminal defendant. | Failed | 68,659 (21.81%) | 246,097 (78.19%) |
| Amendment B | A constitutional amendment clarifying the responsibility of the legislature to provide for its own apportionment. | Failed | 103,172 (30.97%) | 229,985 (69.03%) |
| Amendment C | A constitutional amendment extending the time allowed for the governor’s review of legislation passed by the legislature. | Passed | 166,969 (54.16%) | 141,326 (45.84%) |
| Initiated Measure 1 | An initiative legalizing the cultivation, possession, and sale of industrial hemp with less than 1% THC. | Failed | 119,990 (37.97%) | 196,060 (62.03%) |

=== 2004 ===
| Measure name | Description | Status | Yes votes | No votes |
|---|---|---|---|---|
| Amendment A | A constitutional amendment providing for the merit selection of circuit court judges. | Failed | 138,368 (37.81%) | 227,577 (62.19%) |
| Amendment B | A constitutional amendment authorizing food and transportation services for all school-age children. | Failed | 173,650 (46.99%) | 195,936 (53.01%) |
| Initiated Measure 1 | An initiative exempting food from sales and use taxes. | Failed | 123,210 (32.50%) | 255,855 (67.50%) |

=== 2006 ===
| Measure name | Description | Status | Yes votes | No votes |
|---|---|---|---|---|
| Amendment C | A constitutional amendment only recognizing marriages between a man and a woman and prohibiting civil unions between two or more people regardless of sex. | Passed | 172,305 (51.83%) | 160,152 (48.17%) |
| Amendment D | A constitutional amendment relating to real property assessment for taxation. | Failed | 65,903 (20.20%) | 260,375 (79.80%) |
| Amendment E | A constitutional amendment relating to judicial decisions. | Failed | 35,641 (10.79%) | 294,734 (89.21%) |
| Amendment F | A constitutional amendment relating to the legislature. | Failed | 103,026 (32.35%) | 215,458 (67.65%) |
| Initiated Measure 2 | An initiative increasing the tax on cigarettes and tobacco products. | Passed | 202,779 (60.80%) | 130,757 (39.20%) |
| Initiated Measure 3 | An initiative prohibiting the start of a school term prior to August 31. | Failed | 140,487 (43.14%) | 185,129 (56.86%) |
| Initiated Measure 4 | An initiative allowing qualified individuals to access medical marijuana. | Failed | 157,953 (47.70%) | 173,178 (52.30%) |
| Initiated Measure 5 | An initiative requiring placing certain restrictions on the use of state owned or leased aircraft. | Passed | 180,592 (55.36%) | 145,594 (44.64%) |
| Initiated Measure 7 | An initiative prohibiting video lotteries. | Failed | 110,032 (33.05%) | 222,889 (66.95%) |
| Initiated Measure 8 | An initiative repealing the gross receipts tax on wireless telecommunication services. | Failed | 129,851 (39.38%) | 199,892 (60.62%) |
| Referred Law 6 | A referendum prohibiting abortion except when the mother's life is at risk. | Failed | 148,648 (44.43%) | 185,945 (55.57%) |

=== 2008 ===
| Measure name | Description | Status | Yes votes | No votes |
|---|---|---|---|---|
| Amendment G | A constitutional amendment repealing certain reimbursement restrictions for legislators' travel to and form a legislative session. | Failed | 147,763 (41.14%) | 211,413 (58.86%) |
| Amendment H | A constitutional amendment repealing certain provisions relating to corporations. | Failed | 103,172 (30.97%) | 229,985 (69.03%) |
| Amendment I | A constitutional amendment providing for a maximum of forty legislative days each year. | Passed | 184,722 (52.41%) | 167,751 (47.59%) |
| Amendment J | A constitutional amendment eliminating term limits for legislators. | Failed | 87,380 (24.27%) | 272,635 (75.73%) |
| Initiated Measure 9 | An initiative making certain securities practices and transactions unlawful. | Failed | 146,872 (43.39%) | 191,596 (56.61%) |
| Initiated Measure 10 | An initiative prohibiting tax revenues from being used for lobbying or campaigning, governmental bodies from lobbying, government contractors from making campaign contributions, and government contracts when the contractor employs a legislator or legislative staff member and requiring contracts with governmental bodies to be published. | Failed | 127,040 (35.32%) | 232,684 (64.68%) |
| Initiated Measure 11 | An initiative prohibiting abortions except in cases of rape or incest or when the mother's life or health is at risk. | Failed | 167,560 (44.79%) | 206,535 (55.21%) |

== 2010s ==
=== 2010 ===
| Measure name | Description | Status | Yes votes | No votes |
|---|---|---|---|---|
| Amendment K | A constitutional amendment allowing individuals to vote by secret ballot. | Passed | 241,896 (79.13%) | 63,783 (20.87%) |
| Amendment L | A constitutional amendment authorizing a reduction in mandatory annual transfers from the cement plant trust fund to the state general fund. | Failed | 114,321 (40.55%) | 167,594 (59.45%) |
| Initiated Measure 13 | An initiative legalizing the use and cultivation of marijuana for individuals with certain medical conditions. | Failed | 115,667 (36.69%) | 199,552 (63.31%) |
| Referred Law 12 | A referendum prohibiting tobacco smoking in certain places. | Passed | 204,160 (64.37%) | 113,011 (35.63%) |

=== 2012 ===
| Measure name | Description | Status | Yes votes | No votes |
|---|---|---|---|---|
| Amendment M | A constitutional amendment changing certain provisions relating to corporations. | Failed | 96,187 (29.6%) | 228,720 (70.4%) |
| Amendment N | A constitutional amendment repealing certain restrictions on the reimbursement of legislators for travel to and from a legislative session. | Failed | 125,715 (36.82%) | 215,675 (63.18%) |
| Amendment O | A constitutional amendment changing how much money is transferred from the cement plant trust fund to the state general fund each year. | Passed | 186,956 (56.76%) | 142,410 (43.24%) |
| Amendment P | A constitutional amendment requiring the state budget to be balanced. | Passed | 215,659 (64.6%) | 118,165 (35.4%) |
| Initiated Measure 15 | An initiative increasing the sales tax by 1% to provide funding for public education and Medicaid. | Failed | 151,498 (43.27%) | 198,586 (56.73%) |
| Referred Law 14 | A referendum establishing the large project development fund. | Failed | 139,751 (42.36%) | 190,126 (57.64%) |
| Referred Law 16 | A referendum establishing a teacher scholarship program, creating a program for teacher merit bonuses, and eliminating requirements for teacher tenure. | Failed | 114,590 (32.77%) | 235,064 (67.23%) |

=== 2014 ===
| Measure name | Description | Status | Yes votes | No votes |
|---|---|---|---|---|
| Amendment Q | A constitutional amendment authorizing the legislature to allow roulette, keno, and craps in Deadwood. | Passed | 152,265 (56.69%) | 116,326 (43.31%) |
| Initiated Measure 17 | An initiative requiring health insurance companies to include all qualified healthcare providers on their provider lists. | Passed | 166,401 (61.81%) | 102,792 (38.19%) |
| Initiated Measure 18 | An initiative raising the minimum wage to $8.50 and subsequently increasing it annually based on inflation. | Passed | 150,819 (55.05%) | 123,167 (44.95%) |

=== 2016 ===
| Measure name | Description | Status | Yes votes | No votes |
|---|---|---|---|---|
| Amendment R | A constitutional amendment regarding post-secondary technical education institutions. | Passed | 178,209 (50.61%) | 173,945 (49.39%) |
| Amendment S | An initiated constitutional amendment expanding the rights of crime victims. | Passed | 215,565 (59.61%) | 146,084 (40.39%) |
| Amendment T | An initiated constitutional amendment establishing a commission for state legislative redistricting. | Failed | 149,942 (42.97%) | 198,982 (57.03%) |
| Amendment U | An initiated constitutional amendment limiting the ability to set statutory interest rates for loans. | Failed | 130,627 (34.39%) | 224,876 (63.26%) |
| Amendment V | An initiated constitutional amendment establishing nonpartisan elections. | Failed | 157,870 (44.51%) | 196,781 (55.49%) |
| Initiated Measure 21 | An initiative capping interest rates at 36% on loans from certain lenders. | Passed | 270,312 (75.58%) | 87,355 (24.42%) |
| Initiated Measure 22 | An initiative revising campaign finance and lobbying laws and creating a publicly funded campaign finance program and ethics commission. | Passed | 180,634 (51.63%) | 169,199 (48.37%) |
| Initiated Measure 23 | An initiative giving corporate and nonprofit organizations the right to charge fees for services. | Failed | 71,250 (20.31%) | 279,482 (79.69%) |
| Referred Law 19 | A referendum revising laws regarding elections and election petitions. | Failed | 98,657 (28.95%) | 242,113 (71.05%) |
| Referred Law 20 | A referendum decreasing the minimum wage for workers under age 18. | Failed | 104,185 (28.87%) | 256,686 (71.13%) |

=== 2018 ===
==== Primary Election ====
| Measure name | Description | Status | Yes votes | No votes |
|---|---|---|---|---|
| Amendment Y | A constitutional amendment changing certain provisions relating to the rights of crime victims. | Passed | 106,498 (79.51%) | 27,448 (20.49%) |

==== General Election ====
| Measure name | Description | Status | Yes votes | No votes |
|---|---|---|---|---|
| Amendment W | An initiated constitutional amendment changing campaign finance and lobbying laws, creating a government accountability board, and changing certain initiative and referendum provisions. | Failed | 142,769 (45.06%) | 174,081 (54.94%) |
| Amendment X | A constitutional amendment requiring a 55% vote to approve future constitutional amendments. | Failed | 140,730 (45.68%) | 167,362 (54.32%) |
| Amendment Z | A constitutional amendment requiring proposed constitutional amendments to embrace only one subject. | Passed | 195,790 (62.41%) | 117,947 (37.59%) |
| Initiated Measure 24 | An initiative prohibiting non-residents and out-of-state political committees from contributing to ballot question committees. | Passed (Note: Overturned in May 2019.) | 174,960 (55.52%) | 140,172 (44.48%) |
| Initiated Measure 25 | An initiative increasing the tobacco tax and creating a technical institute fund. | Failed | 148,775 (44.89%) | 182,654 (55.11%) |

== 2020s ==
=== 2020 ===
| Measure name | Description | Status | Yes votes | No votes |
|---|---|---|---|---|
| Amendment A | An initiated constitutional amendment legalizing marijuana for recreational use and requiring the legislature to pass laws regulating hemp and medical marijuana. | Passed (Note: Overturned on February 8, 2021.) | 225,260 (54.18%) | 190,477 (45.82%) |
| Amendment B | A constitutional amendment authorizing the legislature to allow sports wagering in Deadwood. | Passed | 239,620 (58.47%) | 170,191 (41.53%) |
| Initiated Measure 26 | An initiative legalizing marijuana for medical use. | Passed | 291,754 (69.92%) | 125,488 (30.08%) |

=== 2022 ===
==== Primary Election ====
| Measure name | Description | Status | Yes votes | No votes |
|---|---|---|---|---|
| Amendment C | A constitutional amendment requiring a three-fifths vote for ballot measures imposing taxes or fees. | Failed | 59,125 (32.57%) | 122,417 (67.43%) |

==== General Election ====
| Measure name | Description | Status | Yes votes | No votes |
|---|---|---|---|---|
| Amendment D | An initiated constitutional amendment expanding Medicaid eligibility to individuals between 18 and 65 with incomes below 138% of the federal poverty level. | Passed | 192,057 (56.21%) | 149,616 (43.79%) |
| Initiated Measure 27 | An initiative legalizing marijuana for recreational use. | Failed | 163,584 (47.08%) | 183,879 (52.92%) |

=== 2024 ===
| Measure name | Description | Status | Yes votes | No votes |
|---|---|---|---|---|
| Amendment E | A constitutional amendment changing male pronouns in the state constitution to gender-neutral terms. | Failed | 180,365 (42.62%) | 242,866 (57.38%) |
| Amendment F | A constitutional amendment authorizing the state to impose work requirements on certain individuals who are eligible for expanded Medicaid. | Passed | 236,410 (56.12%) | 184,829 (43.88%) |
| Amendment G | An initiated constitutional amendment establishing a right to abortion during the first trimester of pregnancy. | Failed | 176,809 (41.41%) | 250,136 (58.59%) |
| Amendment H | An initiated constitutional amendment establishing top-two primary elections. | Failed | 141,570 (34.39%) | 270,048 (65.61%) |
| Initiated Measure 28 | An initiative prohibiting state sales taxes on anything sold for human consumption except alcoholic beverages and prepared food. | Failed | 129,261 (30.76%) | 290,969 (69.24%) |
| Initiated Measure 29 | An initiative legalizing marijuana for recreational use. | Failed | 189,916 (44.46%) | 237,228 (55.54%) |
| Referred Law 21 | A referendum providing statutory requirements for the regulation of linear transmission facilities and establishing a landowner's bill of rights. | Failed | 165,682 (40.59%) | 242,459 (59.41%) |

=== 2026 ===
| Measure name | Description | Status | Yes votes | No votes |
|---|---|---|---|---|
| Amendment I | A constitutional amendment repealing expanded Medicaid coverage if federal funding drops below 90%. | Failed | 131,202 (44.23%) | 165,420 (55.77%) |
| Amendment J | A constitutional amendment clarifying that only citizens of the United States are eligible to vote. | Passed | 183,765 (61.52%) | 114,928 (38.48%) |
| Amendment K | A constitutional amendment establishing a trust fund for unclaimed property. | Passed | 178,578 (60.94%) | 114,481 (39.06%) |
| Amendment L | A constitutional amendment requiring a 60% supermajority of voters to approve constitutional amendments. | Failed | 126,175 (42.41%) | 171,362 (57.59%) |
