= 686 (disambiguation) =

686 may refer to:

- 686, year 686 AD
- 686 BC
- 686 (number)
- 686 Gersuind, a minor planet orbiting the Sun
- 6-8-6, a wheel arrangement of steam locomotives
- +686, the country calling code for telephone numbers in Kiribati
- Gliese 686, a star in the constellation of Hercules
- Hawaii SB 686, a bill pertaining to cannabis legalization (2019)
- i686, the P6 (sixth-generation) Intel x86 microarchitecture, implemented in the Pentium Pro microprocessor (1995)
- K686, pennant number of Royal Canadian Navy ship HMCS Fergus (1944–1945)
- Kosmos 686, a Soviet satellite launched in 1974
- Minuscule 686, a Greek minuscule manuscript of the New Testament
- Scandinavian Airlines Flight 686, an airplane involved in the 2001 Linate Airport runway collision
- Smith & Wesson Model 686, a revolver
- United Nations Security Council Resolution 686, adopted in March 1991 pertaining to Iraq
- USS Eugene E. Elmore (DE-686), a destroyer escort of the United States Navy (1944–1946)
- USS Halsey Powell (DD-686), a destroyer of the United States Navy (1943–1968)
- USS L. Mendel Rivers (SSN-686), an attack submarine of the United States Navy (1975–2001)
- USS Vester (SP-686), a patrol vessel and minesweeper of the United States Navy (1917–1919)
- VLY-686, an experimental drug known as tradipitant

See also

- List of highways numbered 686
