= 2020 New Jersey Public Question 1 =

Ballot measure legalizing marijuana

Public Question 1
- Constitutional Amendment To Legalize Marijuana

Results
Choice	Votes	%
Yes	2,737,682	67.08%
No	1,343,610	32.92%
Valid votes	4,081,292	88.04%
Invalid or blank votes	554,293	11.96%
Total votes	4,635,585	100.00%
Registered voters/turnout	6,407,297	72.35%
- County results Yes 70–80% 60–70%

New Jersey Public Question 1, the Constitutional Amendment To Legalize Marijuana, was a measure that appeared on the November 3, 2020 New Jersey general election ballot. Question 1 legalized the possession and recreational use of cannabis; although planned to go into effect January 1, 2021, implementation was delayed until February 22 due to a dispute between the governor and legislature over penalties for underage cannabis users. Retail sales are also allowed under the amendment.

New Jersey governor Phil Murphy campaigned on legalizing marijuana in the 2017 gubernatorial election. After numerous unsuccessful attempts to implement legalization via the legislature, in 2019, lawmakers voted to put the issue on the November 2020 ballot as a constitutional amendment.

Along with Arizona, Montana and South Dakota, New Jersey is one of four states that legalized recreational marijuana via ballot measures in 2020. New Jersey was the first state to vote on marijuana legalization as a legislative referral rather than a voter-initiated ballot measure; the latter are not permitted under New Jersey law.

== Results ==
Public Question 1 overwhelmingly passed with 67.1% yes vs 32.9% no. Every county voted at least 60% yes. Monmouth County had the largest number of yes votes, at 244,576, while Camden County had the highest percentage of yes votes, at 75.3%. Middlesex County had the largest number of no votes, at 131,757, while Ocean County had the highest percentage of no votes, at 39.9%.

Public Question 1
Choice	Votes	%
For	2,737,682	67.08
Against	1,343,610	32.92
Total	4,081,292	100.00
Registered voters/turnout	6,407,297	72.35

=== Results by County ===
Results by County
County	Yes	Yes %	No	No %	Total
Atlantic	86,176	69.2%	38,430	30.8%	124,606
Bergen	208,941	66.5%	105,208	33.5%	314,149
Burlington	179,390	71.3%	72,193	28.7%	251,583
Camden	172,531	75.3%	56,667	24.7%	229,198
Cape May	36,353	65.9%	18,775	34.1%	55,128
Cumberland	35,636	66.9%	17,632	33.1%	53,268
Essex	229,144	72.0%	89,315	28.0%	318,459
Gloucester	113,728	70.5%	47,497	29.5%	161,225
Hudson	153,430	71.8%	60,417	28.3%	213,847
Hunterdon	52,994	64.4%	29,292	35.6%	82,286
Mercer	119,390	71.3%	48,171	28.7%	167,561
Middlesex	221,484	62.7%	131,757	37.3%	353,241
Monmouth	244,576	65.6%	128,276	34.4%	372,852
Morris	184,757	61.2%	100,749	35.3%	285,506
Ocean	190,204	60.1%	126,469	39.9%	316,673
Passaic	131,449	63.5%	75,578	36.5%	207,027
Salem	20,911	65.1%	11,188	34.9%	32,099
Somerset	114,904	63.7%	65,595	36.3%	180,499
Sussex	57,583	66.4%	29,158	33.6%	86,741
Union	146,620	67.9%	69,204	32.1%	215,824
Warren	37,481	63.0%	22,039	37.0%	59,520
Total	2,737,682	67.1%	1,343,610	32.9%	4,081,238

== Implementation ==
Shortly after voters decisively approved the measure, a bill to decriminalize marijuana in the interim was introduced in the legislature; while it passed in the Senate, approval stalled in the House amid a contentious provision which would lessen the criminal penalties for possession of psilocybin mushrooms. The psilocybin provision was later removed from the decriminalization bill and signed into law as a standalone piece of legislation.

On December 4, 2020, Governor Murphy announced he had reached an agreement with the legislature's leadership on adult-use cannabis sales. The cannabis regulation bill was approved by committees in both legislative houses on December 14 and during a subsequent floor vote by the full assembly three days later. Murphy did not immediately sign the legislation, citing concerns about the lack of penalties for underage marijuana consumption in the decriminalization bill. Although lawmakers initially indicated they would be willing to introduce a new bill to include underage penalties, they subsequently withdrew that offer on January 8 and indicated Murphy would need to sign or veto the enabling legislation as-is.

After several weeks, a revised "cleanup bill" was introduced in the legislature. Compared to the original bill, fines for people aged 18–20 caught with marijuana were reduced to $50 (from the original $500 maximum fine) and "stationhouse adjustments" for minors were replaced with written warnings from police. These changes were made due to concerns from legislators who opposed the original bill on the grounds that police would use the penalties to unfairly target minorities. These changes were still apparently not enough to win majority support, and on February 17, 2021 state senator Nicholas Scutari (who had led the cleanup bill efforts) said "all avenues to clarify [underage penalties] any further are exhausted" and cancelled a planned committee hearing on the bill. However, the rescheduled committee hearing on February 19 saw the "cleanup bill" being approved in a 6-2 vote.

On February 22, 2021, the underage penalties "cleanup" bill was approved by a full vote of the New Jersey Senate and Assembly and was subsequently signed into law by governor Murphy along with the enabling legislation, making New Jersey the 14th state to legalize recreational cannabis. Police strongly objected to a provision of the cleanup bill which prohibited them from informing the parent or guardian of a person under 18's first alcohol or cannabis possession offense; police could only do so after the second offense under the underage penalties law as enacted. In response, legislators began working on a bill that would permit police to notify a parent or guardian upon a minor's first alcohol or cannabis possession offense. Governor Murphy expressed support for the legislation.

On March 25, 2021, both houses of the New Jersey legislature unanimously passed an amendment to the underage penalties law requiring police to notify the parent or guardian of a minor about any alcohol or marijuana possession offenses. The legislation was signed by the governor the following day.

On April 21, 2022, New Jersey cannabis sales legislation finally went into effect - even though it passed by ballot initiative with New Jersey voters back in November 2020.

== See also ==
- 2020 Arizona Proposition 207
- 2020 Montana Initiative 190
- 2020 South Dakota Constitutional Amendment A
- Cannabis in New Jersey
