= 2010 Arizona Proposition 203 =

Ballot measure legalizing medical marijuana

Proposition 203
- November 2, 2010
- Legalization of Medical Marijuana

Results
Choice	Votes	%
Yes	841,348	50.13%
No	837,008	49.87%
Total votes	1,678,356	100.00%
County results
For
50–60%
Against
60–70%
50–60%

Proposition 203, or the Arizona Medical Marijuana Act, was an Arizona ballot measure to legalize the use of medical marijuana without the normal Food and Drug Administration testing for safety and efficacy. Proposition 203 passed by a narrow margin, with 50.13% of the vote.

== Background ==
Proposition 203 was the fourth time that medical marijuana was on the ballot in Arizona. Arizona voters passed medical marijuana initiatives twice in the state, in 1996 and 1998. Due to a technical error, however, in the wording of these laws, they failed to effectively protect medical marijuana patients from arrest. A third initiative in 2002 to legalize small amounts of marijuana was rejected.

Arizona's medical marijuana initiative does the following:

- Allows terminally and seriously ill patients who find relief from marijuana to use it with their doctors’ approval.
- Protects seriously ill patients from arrest and prosecution for the act of taking their doctor-recommended medicine.
- Permits qualifying patients or their caregivers to legally purchase their medicine from tightly regulated clinics, as they would any other medicine—so they need not purchase it from the criminal market.
- Permits qualifying patients or their caregivers to cultivate their own marijuana for medical use if a regulated medical marijuana clinic is not located within 25 miles (40 km) of the qualifying patient.
- Creates registry identification cards, so that law enforcement officials could easily tell who was a registered patient, and establish penalties for false statements and fraudulent ID cards.
- Allows patients and their caregivers who are arrested to discuss their medical use in court.
- Keeps commonsense restrictions on the medical use of marijuana, including prohibitions on public use of marijuana and driving under the influence of marijuana.

== Media endorsements ==
=== Support ===
- The Arizona Daily Star
- The Desert Lamp
- Goldwater State

=== Opposition ===
- The Arizona Republic
- The East Valley Tribune
- The Yuma Sun

== Results ==
Proposition 203 passed by a narrow margin, making Arizona the fifteenth state to legalize medical marijuana. The passage was announced on November 14, twelve days after the election.

Proposition 203
Choice	Votes	%
For	841,348	50.13
Against	837,008	49.87
Total	1,678,356	100.00
Source: State of Arizona Official Canvass (p. 15)

The count had remained at a virtual standstill, with the proposition failing by several thousand votes until the evening of Friday, November 12, 2010, when it surged ahead with 4,421 votes ahead at 5:35 pm MT as the remaining provisional and early ballots were being counted. The Phoenix New Times declared, "Proposition 203, which had trailed until this afternoon, is now leading by about 4,400 votes."

== Limitations ==
There is an exception to Proposition 203, and it comes in the form of House Bill 2349, which was passed by the House Education Committee in February 2012. This new law states that medical marijuana cannot be possessed or used at educational institutions. HB 2349 defines an educational institution as “any public or private university, college, community college, postsecondary educational institution, high school, junior high school, middle school, common school or preschool.” The Bill has many purposes one of which is to protect students and children from the harmful effects of marijuana. However, a more evident purpose is to keep federal funding. Under the Drug-Free Workplace Act of 1988 and the Drug-Free Schools and Communities Act, a state or school cannot receive any federal aid if they have legalized a drug that has not been approved by the U.S. Food and Drug Administration (FDA). Thus, by extending the marijuana ban to educational institutions, Arizona lawmakers are guaranteeing that the state will receive grants and loans. This has led to much opposition from the public, especially students, who believe they have a right to use medical marijuana if they need it to ease certain symptoms.

== See also ==
- Cannabis in Arizona
