= 2020 Montana Initiative 190 =

2020 cannabis legalization ballot measure

Initiative 190
- Montana Marijuana Legalization and Tax Initiative

Results
Choice	Votes	%
Yes	341,037	56.90%
No	258,337	43.10%
Valid votes	599,374	97.92%
Invalid or blank votes	12,701	2.08%
Total votes	612,075	100.00%
Registered voters/turnout	752,538	81.33%
County results
Yes
70–80%
60–70%
50–60%
No
70–80%
60–70%
50–60%

Montana I-190, the Montana Marijuana Legalization and Tax Initiative was a cannabis legalization initiative that appeared on the November 3, 2020 Montana general election ballot. Passing with 57% approval, the initiative legalized recreational marijuana in the state effective January 1, 2021. Along with Arizona, New Jersey and South Dakota, Montana was one of four states that legalized cannabis via ballot measures in the November 2020 election.

The sponsor of the initiative was New Approach Montana, in partnership with the Marijuana Policy Project.

== History ==
Initiative I-190 (legislation) and matching constitutional amendment initiative were submitted by New Approach Montana to the Montana Secretary of State in January, and approved for signature gathering as of May 1, 2020. Following a lawsuit and a declaration from the Montana Supreme Court, the Montana Secretary of State determined that mail-in voter signatures would be allowed for all initiatives without requiring notary seal, and starting May 9, the sponsors made a downloadable mail-in form available. On June 19, groups collecting voter signatures for the legalization initiative said they had submitted almost twice the minimum to the Secretary of State by the deadline. The sponsors announced in July that they had reached the threshold for ballot inclusion, based on county-level voter certification.

On August 13, the Montana Secretary of State announced it had qualified for the November ballot.

The initiative was approved by voters on November 3, 2020.

== Polling ==
=== Initiative 190 ===
Poll source	Date(s) administered	Sample size (Note: Key: A – all adults RV – registered voters LV – likely voters V – unclear)	Margin of error	For	Against	Undecided / Other	
MSU Billings	Oct. 19–24, 2020	546 (LV)	± 4.2%	54%	38%	7%	–
MSU Bozeman	Sept. 14 – Oct. 2, 2020	1,607 (LV)	± 3.9%	49%	39%	10%	2% (Note: Would not vote with 2%)

=== Legalization of recreational marijuana ===
Poll source	Date(s) administered	Sample size	Margin of error	Yes	No	Undecided
University of Montana	Feb. 21 – Mar. 1, 2019	293 (RV)	± 5.7%	51%	37%	12%
University of Montana	Feb. 12–22, 2020	498 (LV)	± 4.39%	54%	37%	9%

== Results ==
Legalize Recreational Marijuana
Choice	Votes	%
For	341,037	56.90
Against	258,337	43.10
Total	599,374	100.00
Registered voters/turnout	752,538	81.33

== See also ==
- Cannabis in Montana
- 2020 Arizona Proposition 207
- 2020 New Jersey Public Question 1
- 2020 South Dakota Constitutional Amendment A
