= 2020 Arizona Proposition 207 =

Proposition 207
- Legalize Recreational Marijuana

Results
Choice	Votes	%
Yes	1,956,440	60.03%
No	1,302,458	39.97%
Valid votes	3,258,898	95.27%
Invalid or blank votes	161,667	4.73%
Total votes	3,420,565	100.00%
Registered voters/turnout	4,281,152	79.9%

Yes
90–100%
80–90%
70–80%
60–70%
50–60%
No
70–80%
60–70%
50–60%
Other
No votes
- Source: Arizona.Vote

Arizona Proposition 207 was a voter initiative that appeared on the November 3, 2020, Arizona general election ballot to legalize cannabis for recreational use. Passing with 60% of the vote, the initiative legalized the possession of up to an ounce of cannabis, licensed sales at dispensaries, and personal cultivation of up to six plants. Along with Montana, New Jersey and South Dakota, Arizona is one of four states that legalized recreational marijuana via ballot measures in 2020.

The first state-licensed recreational marijuana sales in Arizona took place on January 22, 2021, making Arizona the fastest state to go from a legalization vote to retail sales in U.S. history.

== Provisions ==
Proposition 207, also known as the Smart and Safe Act, legalizes the adult recreational use of marijuana, specifically by allowing adults 21 and older in Arizona to possess up to 1 ounce (28 g) of marijuana (with no more than 5 grams being marijuana concentrate), and to have up to 6 marijuana plants at their home (with up to 12 marijuana plants in households with two or more adult members). It directs the state Department of Health Services to set forth rules for retail marijuana sales by June 1, 2021, allow marijuana to be subject to state and local sales taxes like other retail items, and imposes an additional 16% excise tax on marijuana products, with the revenue being split between the state government agencies responsible for activities relating to the act, highways, community college districts, police departments, and fire departments. The initiative provides that employers may still adopt "drug-free workplace" policies and restrict employees' and applicants' use of marijuana, and provides that the initiative does not permit marijuana use in public spaces. The initiative establishes that the possession of more than an ounce (28 g), but less than 2.5 ounces (71 g), of marijuana, by an adult is a petty offense. The initiative prohibits the sale of marijuana products that resemble a "human, animal, insect, fruit, toy or cartoon" and sets forth penalties for possession of marijuana by minors (which, for a first offense for possession of under an ounce of marijuana, is a $100 fine and drug counseling).

The proposition imposes a 16 percent excise tax on cannabis. The first share of revenue will be used to enforce state cannabis regulations, with the remainder divided as follows: 33% for community colleges, 31.4% for police and fire departments, 25.4% for a highway fund, 10% for a justice fund, and 0.2% to the state attorney general for enforcement.

== History ==
The Arizona Dispensaries Association and Arizona Cannabis Chamber of Commerce began organizing in August 2019 for another ballot initiative after a failed November 2016 ballot initiative. The Arizona Dispensaries Association filed a ballot initiative application on September 26, 2019, for the "Smart and Safe Act," seeking to obtain the necessary 237,645 signatures from registered Arizona voters by the July 2, 2020 deadline to get on the November 3, 2020 ballot.

Arizona legalization initiative, sponsored by Smart and Safe Arizona, had received 150,000 signatures by January 17, 2020, out of a required 237,645 signatures. The initiative likely had exceeded the minimum 237,645 valid signatures by April to appear on the November ballot. On July 1 the sponsors announced they had submitted over 420,000 signatures to the Secretary of State. On August 10, Secretary of State Katie Hobbs announced the initiative had qualified for the 2020 ballot as Proposition (Prop) 207.

The Arizona Republic announced that the initiative had passed on election day, November 3, 2020.

== Polling ==
Likely voters polled in July 2020 indicated 62% support for cannabis legalization.

On Proposition 207

Poll source	Date(s) administered	Sample size (Note: Key: A – all adults RV – registered voters LV – likely voters V – unclear)	Margin of error	For Proposition 207	Against Proposition 207	Other	Undecided
OH Predictive Insights	October 22–25, 2020	716 (LV)	± 3.7%	60%	36%	0% (Note: "Refused" with 0%)	4%
Monmouth University	October 11–13, 2020	502 (RV)	± 4.4%	56%	36%	0% (Note: Would not vote with 0%)	7%
OH Predictive Insights	October 4–8, 2020	608 (LV)	± 4.0%	55%	37%	1% (Note: "Refused" with 1%)	7%
Suffolk University	September 26–30, 2020	500 (LV)	± 4.4%	46%	34%	1% (Note: "Refused" with 1%)	19%
Strategies 360/Smart and Safe Arizona (Note: Smart and Safe Arizona endorsed Proposition 207 prior to this poll's sampling period)	September 24–29, 2020	800 (LV)	± 3.5%	57%	38%	–	5%
Monmouth University	September 11–15, 2020	420 (RV)	± 4.8%	51%	41%	3% (Note: Would not vote with 3%)	6%
Strategies 360/Smart and Safe Arizona (Note: Smart and Safe Arizona endorsed Proposition 207 prior to this poll's sampling period)	Early August, 2020	– (V) (Note: Not yet released)	–	57%	37%	–	6%
HighGround Inc.	May 18–22, 2020	400 (LV)	± 4.9%	66%	25%	–	9% (Note: Includes "Refused")

On whether recreational marijuana should be legal

Poll source	Date(s) administered	Sample size	Margin of error	Yes	No	Other	Undecided
OH Predictive Insights	September 8–10, 2020	600 (LV)	± 4%	45%	44%	0% (Note: "Refused" with 0%)	9%
OH Predictive Insights	July 6–7, 2020	600 (LV)	± 4%	62%	32%	No voters (Note: "Refused" with no voters)	6%
OH Predictive Insights	December 3–4, 2019	628 (LV)	± 3.9%	51%	42%	–	7%
OH Predictive Insights	October 31 – November 8, 2019	900 (RV)	± 3.3%	54%	33%	–	13%
OH Predictive Insights	August 13–14, 2019	600 (LV)	± 4%	50%	40%	–	10%
OH Predictive Insights	February 12–13, 2019	600 (LV)	± 4%	52%	41%	–	7%

== Results ==
Proposition 207
Choice	Votes	%
For	1,956,440	60.03
Against	1,302,458	39.97
Total	3,258,898	100.00
Valid votes	3,258,898	95.27
Invalid/blank votes	161,667	4.73
Total votes	3,420,565	100.00
Registered voters/turnout	4,281,152	79.90

== Notes ==
Partisan clients

== See also ==
- Cannabis in Arizona
- 2020 Montana Initiative 190
- 2020 New Jersey Public Question 1
- 2020 South Dakota Constitutional Amendment A
