= Telephone numbers in Kiribati =

- Country: Kiribati
- Continent: Oceania
- NSN length: 8
- Format: +686 xxxxxxxx
- Country code: +686
- International access: 00

== Number allocations ==
Kiribati numbers were changed from 5 to 8 digits in a phased process between 2013 and 2018.

=== Landlines (fixed) ===
LIST OF ALLOCATIONS
Number range	Usage	Operator
30000000-30009999	Overseas operator	Epcatem Telecom
30001000-30001999	Overseas operator	Phone Group
30121100-30122099	Overseas operator	Concerotel
62000000-62001999	Post paid wireless	Ocean Link
65021000-65022999	Bairiki zone, South Tawara	Ocean Link
65125000-65126999	Betio zone, South Tawara	Ocean Link
65228000-65229999	Bikenibeu zone, South Tawara	Ocean Link
65300000-65300999	Gilbert, Outer Islands	Ocean Link
65400000-65400999	Line Islands	Ocean Link
65500000-65500999	Phoenix Islands	Ocean Link
72000000-72001999	Post paid, IPVPN, MBB	ATHKL (Amalgamating Telecommunications Holdings Kiribati Limited)
72700000-72700999	Gilbert, Outer Islands	ATHKL
73100000-73100999	ATHKL Office	ATHKL
74020000-74029999	SIP IPVPN	ATHKL
74081000-74081999	SIP IPVPN	ATHKL
75021000-75022999	Bairiki zone, South Tawara	ATHKL
75125000-75126999	Betio zone, South Tawara	ATHKL
75228000-75229999	Bikenibeu zone, South Tawara	ATHKL
75300000-75300999	Gilbert, Outer Islands	ATHKL
75381000-75381999	Line Islands	ATHKL
75400000-75400999	Phoenix Islands	ATHKL
75481000-75481999	Line Islands	ATHKL
75500000-75500999	Phoenix Islands	ATHKL

=== Mobile and other services ===
LIST OF ALLOCATIONS
Number range	Usage	Operator
63000000-63019999	Cellular Mobile	Ocean Link
720XXXXX-729XXXXX	Mobile, North and South Tawara	3G
73000000-73059999	Cellular Mobile	ATHKL
73140000-73140999	ATHKL Staff Mobile	ATHKL
733XXXXX-749XXXXX	Mobile	3G
780XXXXX-782XXXXX	Mobile, Kiritimati	3G
783XXXXX-785XXXXX	Mobile	3G

=== Special services ===
LIST OF ALLOCATIONS
Usage	Number
International direct dial	00
Faults and Service Difficulties	100
Police (Child abuse & domestic against violence)	188
Police	192
Fire	193
Ambulance Bikenibeu	194
Ambulance Betio	195
Shipping information	1050
Weather information	1055
Airport information	1059
Time announcement (language 1)	1051
Time announcement (language 2)	1052

== See also ==
- Telecommunications in Kiribati
