= Hawaii SB 686 =

2019 Hawaii cannabis legalization proceeded with SB 686 / HB 708, introduced January 2019. The bill was listed as a "top priority" for the 2019 legislative year, President of Hawaii Senate Ron Kouchi, and supported by the Hawaii Democratic Party chairperson Keali'i Lopez. It was opposed by Governor David Ige.

SB 686 passed the Senate Judiciary committee unanimously on February 9, 2019.

The same year a plethora of other bills (11 in the state House, 11 in the Senate) were introduced to legalize cannabis.

== Provisions ==
SB 686 legalizes the possession of less than half an ounce of cannabis for those over age 21 and levies 15 percent surcharge in addn to the general excise tax. sales starting in February 2021. Thirty percent of the surcharge would go to a public education campaign including cannabis and impaired driving. The bill would eliminate all criminal statues in Hawaii concerning cannabis except distribution to minors (minors themselves would not be committing a cannabis crime), and require expungement of criminal records for cannabis crimes.
