= New Jersey Cannabis Regulatory and Expungement Aid Modernization Act =

Proposed legislation to legalize marijuana

New Jersey Cannabis Regulatory and Expungement Aid Modernization Act (S.2703) is proposed legislation to legalize, tax and regulate adult-use cannabis in the U.S. state of New Jersey, and to expunge certain drug-related offenses. A state Senate–Assembly joint committee passed the bill in November 2018 for a vote by both houses. The state governor Phil Murphy indicated support for legalization in his 2017 campaign.

Earlier proposed legislation provided for expungement of cannabis offenses in separate bills from actual legalization. Expungement in the 2018 proposal was "central to gaining support" in the legislature.

State senator Nicholas Scutari was a primary sponsor of the bill. He also was a primary sponsor of New Jersey S. 119, the Compassionate Use Medical Marijuana Act, which he introduced in January 2005, five years before it was enacted. After "stalling" the bill was revived when legislators and the governor agreed to set a tax rate of $42.00 an ounce vice a percentage of the sale price. The New York Times reported in February, 2019 that the settling of the tax rate question "could place the state [of New Jersey] on a path to legalizing recreational marijuana this year". On March 18, both chambers advanced the bill for a floor vote.

The prospects of this bill in New Jersey are said to be "a litmus test" for New York state.

Legislators and the governor have said if the bill does not pass in March, 2019 they will continue to try to get it passed in the new session beginning in November.

On May 15 it was announced by the Senate president that the bill could not clear the legislature, and would instead become a 2020 voter referendum.

== Polling ==
On S.2703

Poll source	Date(s) administered	Sample size (Note: Key: A – all adults RV – registered voters LV – likely voters V – unclear)	Margin of error	For S.2703	Against S.2703	Other	Undecided
Rutgers-Eagleton	October 19–24, 2020	861 (LV)	± 4%	61%	34%	–	5%
Stockton College	October 7–13, 2020	721 (LV)	± 3.7%	66%	23%	–	10%
DKC Analytics/Brach Eichler (Note: Brach Eichler is a law firm that already supported S.2703 prior to conducting this poll)	October 5–13, 2020	500 (LV)	± 4.4%	65%	29%	–	6%
Fairleigh Dickinson University	September 30 – October 5, 2020	582 (LV)	± 4.6%	59%	30%	0% (Note: "Refused" with 0%)	11%
DKC Analytics/Brach Eichler	September 8–16, 2020	501 (LV)	± 4.4%	65%	29%	–	6%
DKC Analytics/Brach Eichler	August 5–13, 2020	500 (LV)	± 4.383%	66%	27%	–	7%
Pollfish/DKC Analytics/Brach Eichler	July 7–12, 2020	500 (LV)	± 4.383%	68%	27%	–	6%
Monmouth University	April 16–19, 2020	635 (RV)	± 3.9%	61%	34%	–	5%

On whether recreational marijuana should be legal

Poll source	Date(s) administered	Sample size	Margin of error	Yes	No	Undecided
Monmouth University	February 8–10, 2019	604 (A)	± 4%	62% (Note: Listed as "Supporting the legalisation of possession of small amounts of marijuana for personal use)	32%	5%

== Notes ==
Partisan clients
