= 2020 South Dakota Measure 26 =

Ballot measure legalizing medical marijuana

Initiated Measure 26
- Medical Marijuana Initiative

Results
Choice	Votes	%
Yes	291,754	69.92%
No	125,488	30.08%
Valid votes	417,242	97.59%
Invalid or blank votes	10,287	2.41%
Total votes	427,529	100.00%
Registered voters/turnout	578,655	73.88%
County results
Yes
50–60%
60–70%
70–80%
80–90%
No
50–60%

South Dakota Initiated Measure 26 was a 2020 voter initiative to legalize medical cannabis in the U.S. state of South Dakota. The initiative was certified by the South Dakota Secretary of State for the 2020 ballot on December 19, 2019. The sponsor of the initiative was New Approach South Dakota, a volunteer group headed by Melissa Mentele. The group had unsuccessfully tried to get an initiative on the 2018 ballot. Polling in September 2020 indicated 70% voter support for the initiative.

On November 3, 2020, the initiative passed with 70% approval. With the passage of Constitutional Amendment A on the same ballot, South Dakota would have become the first state in US history to legalize recreational and medical cannabis simultaneously, but Amendment A was struck down as unconstitutional the following February, pending a higher court's ruling.

After the election, South Dakota governor Kristi Noem requested the state legislature delay the implementation of IM 26 from July 2021 until 2022, ostensibly to give the state more time to prepare due to complications stemming from the COVID-19 pandemic. State House members agreed to reduce the proposed delay from July 2021 until January 2022 and subsequently passed Noem's legislation, but disagreements with the Senate over an amendment to the bill legalizing personal possession of cannabis resulted in the collapse of legislative negotiations on medical marijuana. IM 26 therefore went into effect on July 1, 2021, as South Dakota Codified Law 34-20G, as originally planned.

On November 24, 2021, the South Dakota Supreme Court upheld a lower court's ruling that nullified the voter-passed Amendment A to the state constitution.

== Results ==
Choice	Votes	%
For	291,754	69.92
Against	125,488	30.08
Blank votes	10,287	-
Total	427,529	100
Registered voters/turnout	578,655	73.88
Source: South Dakota Secretary of State

== See also ==
- Cannabis in South Dakota
