= 2020 South Dakota Amendment A =

Constitutional Amendment A
- Marijuana Legalization Initiative

Results
Choice	Votes	%
Yes	225,260	54.18%
No	190,477	45.82%
Valid votes	415,737	97.24%
Invalid or blank votes	11,792	2.76%
Total votes	427,529	100.00%
Registered voters/turnout	578,655	73.88%
County results
Yes
80–90%
70–80%
60–70%
50–60%
No
70–80%
60–70%
50–60%

South Dakota Constitutional Amendment A, the Marijuana Legalization Initiative, was a cannabis legalization initiative that appeared on the November 3, 2020 South Dakota general election ballot. Passing with 54% of the vote, the measure would have legalized recreational marijuana in South Dakota effective July 1, 2021. Additionally, Amendment A required the South Dakota State Legislature to establish a medical marijuana program and legal hemp sales by April 1, 2022.

On February 8, 2021, Amendment A was struck down as unconstitutional by Judge Christina Klinger on the grounds that it violated the state's single-subject rule for ballot initiatives. The case was appealed to the state supreme court which upheld the decision on November 24, 2021.

With the passage of South Dakota Initiated Measure 26 on the same ballot, South Dakota would have become the first state in US history to legalize recreational and medical cannabis simultaneously. Along with Arizona, Montana, and New Jersey, South Dakota was one of four states that voted to legalize cannabis via ballot measures in the November 2020 election.

== Legal challenge ==
On November 20, 2020, a lawsuit was filed by Pennington County Sheriff Kevin Thom and South Dakota Highway Patrol Superintendent Rick Miller seeking to have Amendment A invalidated. The plaintiffs argued that the initiative violated the state's single-subject ballot measure provision and was a "revision" (which would require a constitutional convention) rather than an amendment. Public reaction to the lawsuit was negative and the Pennington County Sheriff Office's Facebook page was review bombed shortly after it was filed.

On January 8, 2021, South Dakota governor Kristi Noem issued an executive order which revealed she had directed Miller to file the lawsuit in her capacity as governor. Noem was strongly opposed to Amendment A and an active participant in the campaign against it prior to the election.

Oral arguments were heard in the case on January 27, 2021. The presiding judge was Christina Klinger, who was appointed as a Circuit Court judge by Governor Noem in 2019.

The amendment was struck down as unconstitutional by Judge Klinger on February 8, 2021, who ruled that it violated the single-subject provision. The case was appealed to the state supreme court, with attorneys defending Amendment A submitting their arguments to the state supreme court on March 10, 2021. Oral arguments were heard on April 28. On November 24, the court ruled in favor of the plaintiffs in a 4–1 decision, upholding the lower court's ruling.

== Results ==
Choice	Votes	%
For	225,260	54.18
Against	190,477	45.82
Blank votes	11,792	-
Total	427,529	100
Registered voters/turnout	578,655	73.88
Source: South Dakota Secretary of State

== See also ==
- Cannabis in South Dakota
- 2020 Arizona Proposition 207
- 2020 Montana Initiative 190
- 2020 New Jersey Public Question 1
