= Cannabis in Arizona =

Arizona's Cannabis Universal Symbol

Cannabis in Arizona is legal for recreational use. A 2020 initiative to legalize recreational use (Proposition 207, the Smart and Safe Act) passed with 60% of the vote. Possession and cultivation of recreational cannabis became legal on November 30, 2020, with the first state-licensed sales occurring on January 22, 2021.

Medical use was legalized in 2010 through the passage of Proposition 203 (approved with 50.1% of the vote), with the first licensed sales occurring in December 2012.

== Medical use ==
=== Proposition 200 (1996) ===
In 1996, 65% of Arizona voters approved Proposition 200 (the "Drug Medicalization, Prevention and Control Act"), a drug policy reform initiative that contained a provision allowing physicians to prescribe cannabis. The medical use provision was then essentially repealed by state legislators a few months later, but the change was rejected by voters in a 1998 veto referendum (Proposition 300). Ultimately the medical use provision was ineffective, however, due to language that created significant conflict with federal law (use of the word "prescribe" instead of "recommend").

Former U.S. Senator and Republican presidential nominee Barry Goldwater was among the supporters of the initiative, serving as honorary chairman of the Proposition 200 campaign. The main sponsor in support of the initiative was University of Phoenix founder John Sperling.

=== Proposition 203 (2002) ===
In November 2002, Proposition 203, a medical cannabis initiative that also sought to decriminalize recreational use, failed with 42.7% of the vote. Included in the initiative were requirements to: (a) allow patients to possess up to two ounces (57 g) of cannabis and grow 2 plants; (b) establish a state-run system for the distribution of medical cannabis to patients; (c) decriminalize up to 2 ounces (57 g) of cannabis for any use (punishable by a $250 fine); and (d) enact new sentencing reforms for non-violent drug offenses (expanding upon the 1996 reforms). Proposition 203 was opposed by the state's law enforcement community, both major party gubernatorial candidates (Democrat Janet Napolitano and Republican Matt Salmon), and drug czar John P. Walters who traveled to the state to campaign against the initiative.

=== Proposition 203 (2010) ===
In November 2010, Proposition 203, an initiative seeking to legalize the medical use of cannabis, was approved with 50.1% of the vote. The initiative allowed patients with a doctor's recommendation to possess up to 2 1/2 ounces (71 g) of cannabis for treatment of certain qualifying conditions. It limited the number of dispensaries to 124 and specified that only patients who reside more than 25 miles (40 km) from a dispensary could cultivate their own cannabis. Proposition 203 was approved despite opposition from Governor Jan Brewer, Attorney General Terry Goddard, all of the state's sheriffs and county prosecutors, and many other state politicians.

In May 2011, Brewer and Attorney General Tom Horne filed a lawsuit in federal court questioning some of the initiative's provisions. The lawsuit sought a ruling on whether state employees involved in implementing certain provisions were subject to federal prosecution. Citing this uncertainty, the state also announced that it would suspend the issuance of licenses for medical cannabis dispensaries. The lawsuit was dismissed in January 2012; a federal judge found that the issue was not ripe as there was no indication that the federal government would prosecute Arizona officials for implementing the act. Brewer subsequently lifted the moratorium, allowing state officials to begin implementing the initiative. The first licensed dispensary opened to the public on December 6, 2012.

In May 2012, Brewer signed legislation that made illegal the possession of medical cannabis on college campuses. The Arizona Supreme Court ruled in May 2018 that the law was unconstitutional, however.

== Recreational use ==
=== Proposition 205 (2016) ===
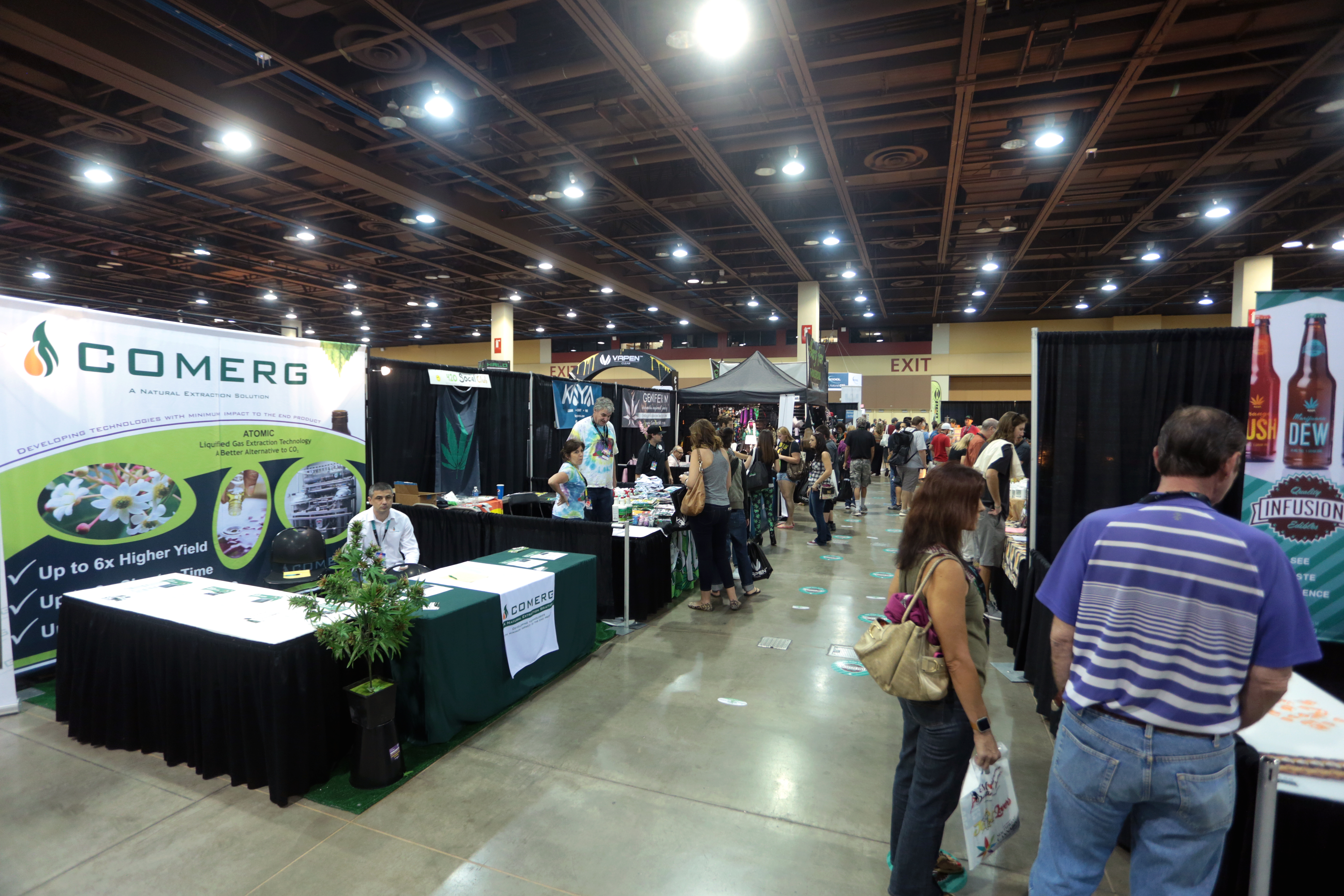
2016 Southwest Cannabis Conference & Expo in Phoenix

In November 2016, Proposition 205, an initiative to legalize the recreational use of cannabis, failed with 48.7% of the vote. The initiative would have allowed adults to possess up to one ounce (28 g) of cannabis and cultivate up to six plants for personal use. It also would have established a system for commercial distribution and taxation of cannabis, with excess tax revenues (after paying expenses) dedicated to funding public schools and substance abuse programs.

The campaign to defeat Proposition 205 raised more than $6 million, aided significantly by the fundraising efforts of Gov. Doug Ducey. Among the largest contributors to the opposition were Discount Tire ($1,000,000), Arizona Chamber of Commerce and Industry ($918,000), Sheldon Adelson ($500,000), and Insys Therapeutics ($500,000). The top contributors in support of the initiative were Marijuana Policy Project ($1,715,000), Dr. Bronner's Magic Soaps ($550,000), and Drug Policy Alliance ($350,000).

=== Proposition 207 (2020) ===
Recreational use of cannabis was legalized through the passage of Proposition 207 on November 3, 2020. Organizing for the initiative began in August 2019 by the Arizona Dispensaries Association and Arizona Cannabis Chamber of Commerce. The Arizona Dispensaries Association filed a ballot initiative application on September 26, 2019, for the "Smart and Safe Act", seeking to obtain the necessary 237,645 signatures from registered Arizona voters by the July 2, 2020 deadline. The Smart and Safe Arizona campaign ultimately submitted more than 420,000 signatures to the Secretary of State's Office. On August 11, 2020, the Secretary of State announced that the initiative had qualified for the November ballot as Proposition 207.

The Smart and Safe Act legalized adult recreational use of marijuana by allowing Arizona adults to possess up to 1 ounce (28 g) of marijuana (with no more than 5 grams being marijuana concentrate), and by allowing each adult to have up to 6 marijuana plants at their home (with up to 12 marijuana plants in households with two or more adult members). It directed the state Department of Health Services to set rules for retail marijuana sales by June 1, 2021, makes marijuana subject to state and local sales taxes like other retail items, and imposes an additional 16% excise tax on marijuana products. The revenue is used to implement and enforce regulations related to the act; the remaining revenue is split between community colleges (33%), police and fire departments (31.4%), the state highway fund (25.4%), a justice reinvestment fund (10%), and the state attorney general for enforcement (0.2%). The initiative allows employers to adopt "drug-free workplace" policies and restrict employees' and applicants' use of marijuana, and does not permit the use of marijuana in any public spaces. The initiative established that the possession by an adult of more than one ounce (28 g), but less than 2.5 oz (71 g), of marijuana, is a petty offense. It also prohibits the sale of marijuana products that resemble a "human, animal, insect, fruit, toy or cartoon" and sets forth penalties for possession of marijuana by minors (which, for a first offense for possession of under one ounce (28 g) of marijuana, is a $100 fine and drug counseling).

The Arizona Chamber of Commerce and Industry opposed the ballot initiative, contending that it would lead to "an uptick in workplace accidents and lower overall workplace productivity". Opponents of the measure sought to exclude Proposition 207 from the ballot, asserting that the 100-word ballot statement was defective. That claim was rejected unanimously by the Arizona Supreme Court.

The Smart and Safe Act passed with 60% of the vote on November 3, 2020. Possession and cultivation of cannabis became legal on November 30, 2020, when the results of the election were certified. State-licensed sales of recreational cannabis began on January 22, 2021, making Arizona the quickest state in U.S. history to begin retail sales after recreational legalization.

== Advocacy ==
In Arizona, United States Air Force Veteran Robert Deals, represented by the Last Prisoner Project, remains incarcerated for an 18-year cannabis sentence while recreational use is legal in the state.

Arizona Supreme Court Justice and former Maricopa County Attorney Bill Montgomery has been a leading opponent of cannabis reform efforts in the state of Arizona. He has made a number of controversial comments on the subject, including telling a military veteran who spoke in support of legalization: "I have no respect for you ... because you're an enemy." Montgomery engaged in a multi-year legal battle seeking to overturn the state's medical cannabis law that was approved by voters in 2010.
