= Cannabis in Montana =

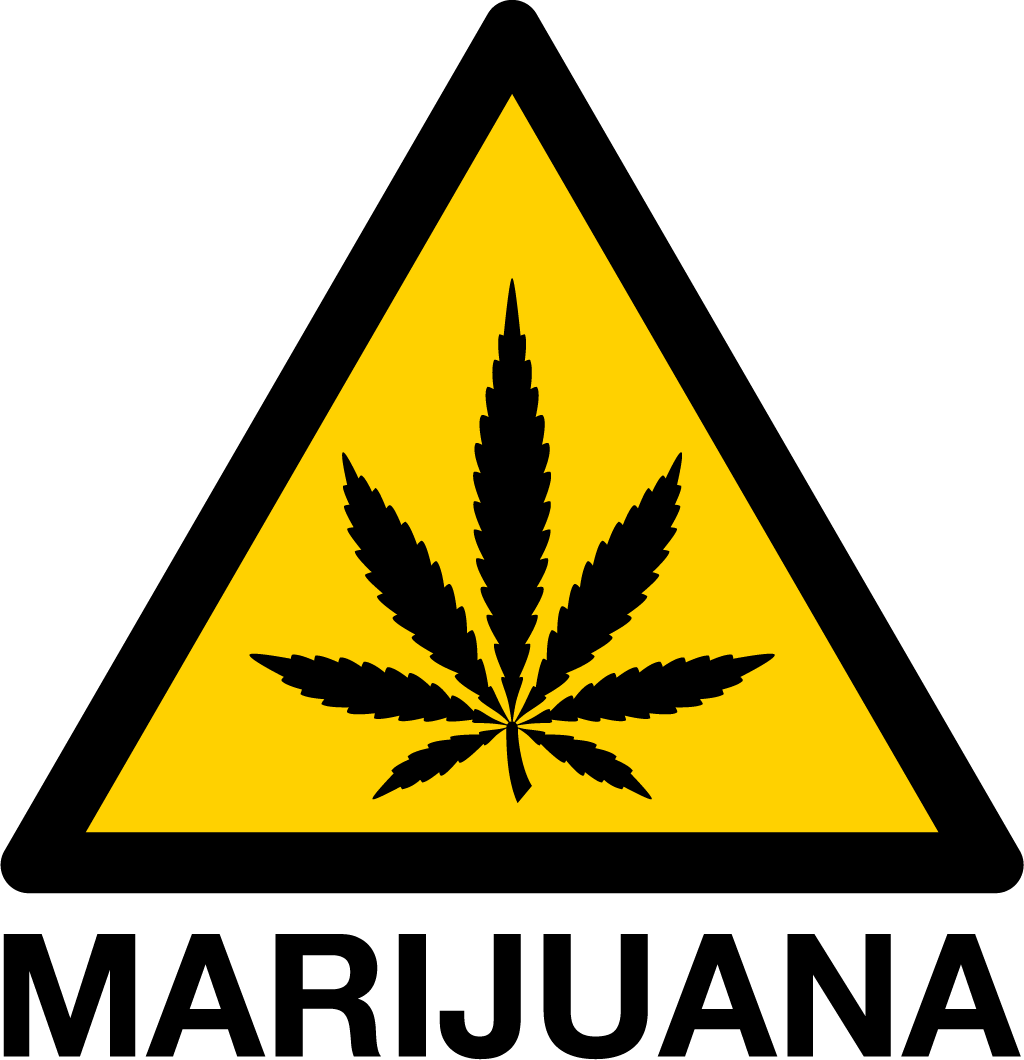
Montana's THC Universal Symbol

Cannabis in Montana has been legal for both medical and recreational use since January 1, 2021, when Initiative 190 went into effect. Prior to the November 2020 initiative, marijuana was illegal for recreational use starting in 1929. Medical cannabis was legalized by ballot initiative in 2004. The Montana Legislature passed a repeal to tighten Montana Medical Marijuana (MMJ) laws which were never approved by the governor. However, with the new provisions, providers could not service more than three patients. In November 2016 Bill I-182 was passed, revising the 2004 law and allowing providers to service more than three patients. In May 2023, numerous further bills on cannabis legalization and other related purposes passed the Montana Legislature. The Governor of Montana is yet to either sign or veto the bill.

== Background ==
=== Prohibition (1929) ===
Cannabis was banned in Montana in 1929, following a Health Committee meeting which was described in the local paper as "great fun", during which representative Dr Fred Fulsher of Mineral County justified the ban due to marijuana's effects on Mexicans: "When some beet field peon takes a few rares of this stuff... he thinks he has just been elected president of Mexico so he starts out to execute all his political enemies."

=== Kurth Ranch case ===
In 1985, the Kurth family of Fort Benton turned to growing cannabis to save their failing beef ranch. Their efforts were successful, and after reducing their debts they decided to scale back their cannabis business, but were then threatened by drug traffickers they had done business with. The ranch was attacked by criminals impersonating DEA agents who beat the owners and stole plants, and the couple was threatened with reporting their activities to the DEA if they did not pay extortion money. The extortionists did indeed report the ranch, and in October 1987 it was raided by the DEA, and the Kurths arrested.

Following their prosecution on drug charges, the Kurths were informed that they also owed tax on their cannabis proceeds to the Montana Department of Revenue. In the case of Montana Department of Revenue v. Kurth Ranch (1994), the Supreme Court concluded that Montana's 1987 Dangerous Drug Tax Act, passed just weeks before the Kurth's arrest, was a punitive tax rather than normal revenue generation, and that to tax their proceeds after the Kurths had already been punished for drug charges would be unconstitutional double jeopardy.

== Medical cannabis ==
Measure I 148, the Montana Medical Marijuana Act, was a ballot initiative approved by 62% of the popular vote in 2004: 276,042 to 170,579.

=== 2011 attempted repeal and limitations ===
In 2011, House Bill 161 to repeal I-148 was passed by both houses of the Montana Legislature, but vetoed by Governor Brian Schweitzer. Following the veto, the Legislature instead placed strong restrictions on the medical program, but a number of the restrictions were blocked by state District Judge James Reynolds pending further review. The 2011 attempts at limitations were sparked by the rapidly growing number of medical marijuana cardholders in the state, growing from 2,000 in March 2009, to 31,000 by May 2011; following the restrictions, by November 2014 the number of cardholders had dropped to over 9,000.

=== 2016 ballot initiatives ===
As of mid-2015, there were three proposed ballot initiatives for the November 2016 elections in Montana: I-182 a proposal to loosen the rules on quantities and recipients for medical cannabis including adding Post Traumatic Stress Disorder (PTSD) as a qualifying condition; Glendive journalist Anthony Varriano's proposal to legalize recreational cannabis for adults 21 and over; and Anti Cannabis group Safe Montana's proposal to require Montana's drug policy to follow federal policy, which would put an end to the state's medical marijuana program. On November 6, 2016, Initiative I-182 passed with 58% approval.

=== 2017 legislation ===
Montana’s Department of Public Health and Human Services (DPHHS) oversees the state’s medical marijuana program, and they opted to use the Marijuana Enforcement Tracking Regulation and Compliance system. In May 2017 Governor Steve Bullock signed into law SB333, which further regulates the medical cannabis industry by adding mandatory testing and seed to sale tracking. SB 333 also imposes a 4% tax on medical marijuana beginning July 1, 2017 and decreases to 2% beginning on July 1, 2018.

== Adult use initiative (2020) ==
In January 2020, marijuana activists associated with New Approach Montana submitted Montana I-190, a ballot initiative to legalize cannabis in the state. On August 13, the state Secretary of State announced it had qualified for the November ballot. On November 3, 2020, the bill passed.

Starting January 1, 2021, people of the age of 21 and over are allowed to possess and use up to one ounce (28 g) of marijuana. However, consumption and possession in public (including medical marijuana) and certain other locations is illegal, including on federal lands and waters (falling under federal law). Licensed Montana Medical Marijuana Program providers are allowed to sell marijuana products to registered cardholders in the program. An individual cardholder may possess up to 1 ounce (28 g) of marijuana, and purchase up to 5 ounces (140 g) per 30 day period, but not distribute to other people. Adult use sales became legal on January 1, 2022, in counties that voted yes on I-190. Counties that voted no are allowed to hold a local referendum later, and if approved by a majority of voters, can start adult use sales. Cultivation is legal as of July 1, 2023, before this date, only licensed medical marijuana providers were allowed. Adult use marijuana will be taxed at 20%.
