= List of District of Columbia ballot measures =

The District of Columbia (a political division coterminous with Washington, D.C.) has had a system of direct voting since 1979, shortly after it gained home rule in 1973. Residents have the ability to place new legislation, or legislation recently passed by the city council, on the ballot for a popular vote. The district has three types of ballot measures that can be voted on in a general election: District Charter amendments, initiatives and referendums. In order to be placed on the ballot, supporters of a measure must gather signatures from registered voters.

Since adopting this process, ballot measures have become a common part of the city's electoral system. As of 2022, more than 150 different initiatives had been filed with the district, along with a significantly smaller number of referendums; of those, only 29 have met the required qualifications to be placed on the ballot. Ballot measures have been used to legalize politically contentious policies such as local term limits, abolition of the tipped minimum wage, cannabis use, and advancements in the District of Columbia statehood movement.

== Background ==
Since the late 1800s, the residents of the District of Columbia have campaigned for control over their own affairs. In a substantial leap forward, the United States Congress passed the District of Columbia Home Rule Act in 1973, which devolved some of its powers to the city. Just a few years later in 1979, the newly formed city council passed the Initiative, Referendum, and Recall Procedures Act. This act created a process of direct democracy in which residents could enact their own laws or repeal existing laws.

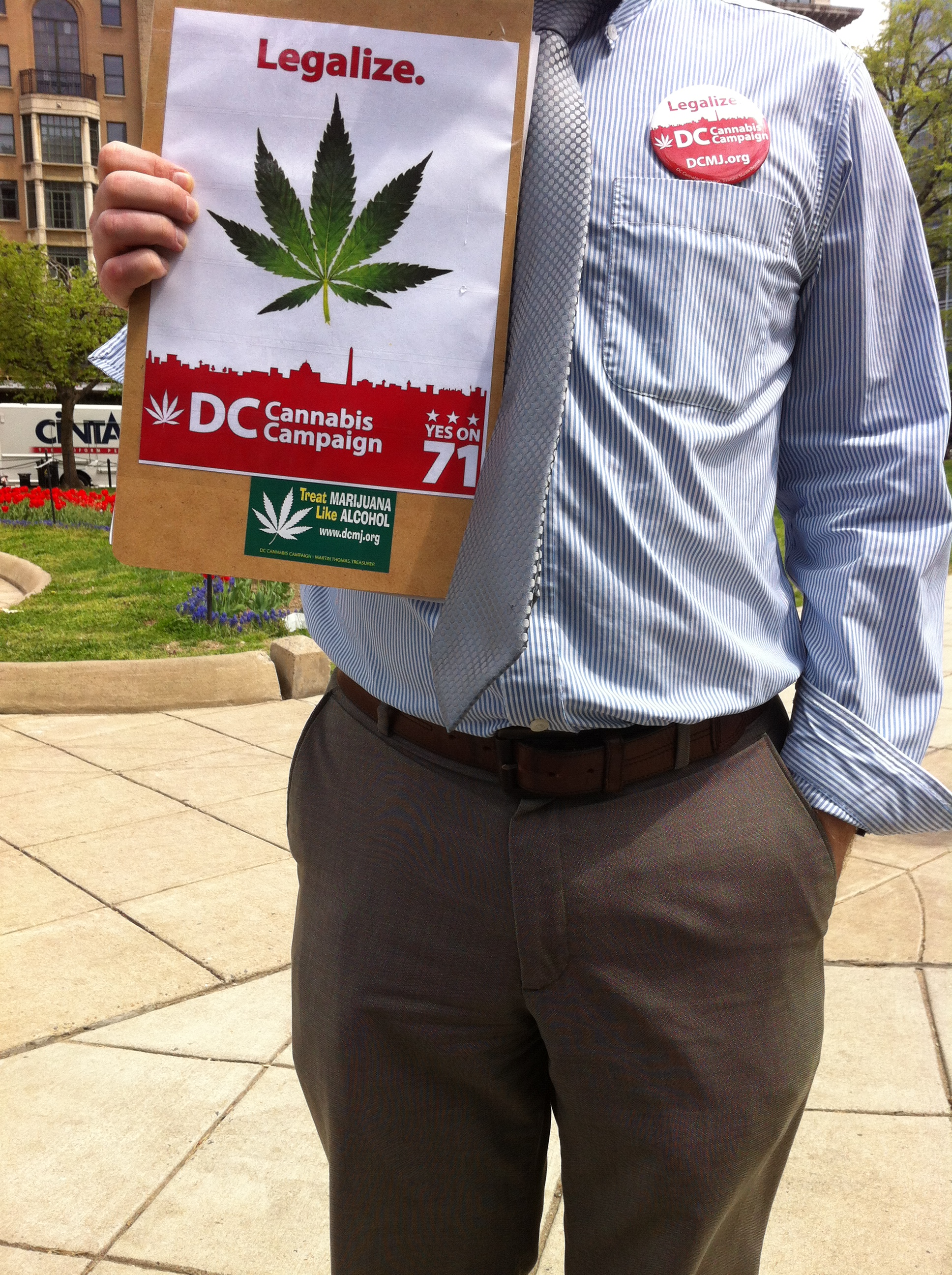
A canvasser soliciting signatures for Initiative 71

The prominence of ballot measures has allowed Washington, D.C., to lead the nation in social issues. In 2014, residents approved Initiative 71, which legalized cannabis for recreational use, making the district the third U.S. jurisdiction behind Colorado and Washington state. The Entheogenic Plant and Fungus Policy Act of 2020 made the city the fourth U.S. jurisdiction to decriminalize entheogens. In 2022, voters approved Initiative 82, which eliminates the tipped minimum wage over five years, after an earlier initiative ultimately failed. It joined eight states in abolishing the practice.

Residents have also used ballot measures to expand their voting rights and (by extension) campaign for admitting the District of Columbia into the Union as the 51st state. An initiative in 1980 directed the D.C. government to begin the process of moving towards statehood due to the stalled and limited-in-scope voting rights amendment. Voters made the Attorney General for the District of Columbia an elected office beginning in 2014. An advisory referendum in 2016 showed that nearly 90 percent of residents support statehood, and it directed the D.C. Council to make formal statehood petitions to Congress.

== Types of ballot measures ==
=== District Charter amendments ===
District Charter amendments are changes to the District of Columbia Home Rule Charter, the law that established the D.C. government and its authority. They require a majority vote to pass the D.C. Council, a majority of voters to approve the amendment, and then are submitted to Congress for a 35-business day congressional review period. If Congress does not pass a resolution of disapproval, the amendment is adopted.

=== Initiatives ===
- Initiatives are measures placed on the ballot and, if passed, directly become law. They must meet specific requirements under the District Charter, including not authorizing discrimination or appropriating funds. In order to place an initiative or referendum on the ballot, supporters must file a proposal with the District of Columbia Board of Elections. Upon approval, there is a 10-day challenge period before supporters can begin gathering signatures. To be placed on the ballot, signatures equal to five percent of registered voters must be gathered.

=== Referendums ===
There are two types of referendums in the District of Columbia:

- Referendums are measures that seek to overturn or repeal laws recently-enacted by the D.C. government. Referendums are subject to the same requirements as initiatives.
- Advisory referendums are questions to gauge public opinion on a potential action of the D.C. Council.

== Barriers to enactment ==
The D.C. government has concluded that approved ballot measures become self-enacting – meaning the government does not need to take action, such as an approving signature or proclamation, for the measure to take effect. However, many approved ballot measures have been invalidated by either the D.C. Council or Congress, much to the frustration of residents.

=== D.C. Council ===
The Initiative, Referendum, and Recall Procedures Act gives the D.C. Council the power to reverse voter-approved initiatives, as it did in 2001 regarding term limits (Initiative 49) and in 2018 regarding the tipped minimum wage (Initiative 77).

=== Congressional intervention ===
Congress has ultimate authority over the district, including its budget. As a result, members of Congress, who do not represent the district and are not accountable to them, often add little-noticed clauses and amendments to the budget in order to manipulate or block the implementation of the city's laws. Two ballot measures were interfered with using this method:

- Initiative 59, which legalized cannabis for medical use, was blocked via the Barr Amendment, named after Congressman Bob Barr. It even prevented the D.C. government from counting the results of the ballot measure vote for over a year. The amendment remained in effect until Congress voluntarily overturned it in 2009.
- Initiative 71, which legalized cannabis for recreational use, was manipulated with a rider written by Congressman Andy Harris. It blocks the D.C. government from regulating the sale of cannabis, creating an unregulated gift economy. The rider remains in effect as of 2022.

Initiative 77 was threatened by an amendment written by Congressmen Mark Meadows and Gary Palmer to block it from taking effect. The amendment did not appear in the final enacted budget bill; it was instead repealed by the D.C. Council.

== List of ballot measures since 1979 ==
Year	Measure name	Description	Status	Yes votes	No votes	Ref.
1980	Initiative 2	An initiative to legalize some forms of gambling, including a lottery, bingo, raffles, and some sports betting	Failed	14,871 (39.23%)	23,032 (60.77%)	
1980	Initiative 3	An initiative to begin the process of moving the District of Columbia to statehood	Passed	90,533 (59.7%)	60,972 (40.2%)	
1980	Initiative 6	An initiative to legalize some forms of gambling for charitable purposes	Passed	104,899 (63.6%)	59,833 (36.3%)	
1981	Initiative 7	An initiative to provide tuition tax credits for public education	Failed	8,904 (10.76%)	73,829 (89.24%)	
1982	Initiative 9	An initiative to require a mandatory minimum prison sentence, without the opportunity for parole, for people convicted for some crimes	Passed	82,238 (72.25%)	31,579 (27.75%)	
1982	Initiative 10	An initiative supporting a nuclear freeze between the United States and the USSR	Passed	77,521 (69.91%)	33,369 (30.09%)	
1983	Initiative 11	An initiative to require the preservation of the historic Rhodes' Tavern and protect it from development	Passed	22,114 (59.68%)	14,938 (40.32%)	
1984	Initiative 17	An initiative to guarantee a right to adequate overnight shelter for homeless people	Passed; repealed	109,080 (72.12%)	42,159 (27.88%)	
1985	Referendum 1	A referendum to maintain rent control provisions for some kinds of housing	Passed	22,920 (50.82%)	22,183 (49.18%)	
1987	Initiative 25	An initiative stating that the funding of public education is a high priority and requiring the government adhere to a schedule of public hearings for public education funding	Passed	54,729 (77.14%)	16,223 (22.86%)	
1987	Initiative 28	An initiative to require beverage retailers provide a five-cent refund for all cans and bottles returned	Failed	42,574 (55.00%)	34,834 (45.00%)	
1990	Referendum 5	A referendum to guarantee a right to adequate overnight shelter for homeless people	Failed	60,734 (48.72%)	63,913 (51.28%)	
1991	Initiative 31	An initiative to ban horse-drawn carriages from operating on public streets	Failed	19,429 (38.00%)	31,403 (62.00%)	
1991	Referendum 6	A referendum to hold gun manufacturers liable when use of their weapons results in pain, death, or medical expenses	Passed	40,196 (77.00%)	11,692 (23.00%)	
1992	Initiative 41	An initiative to limit individual contributions for local elections	Passed	122,502 (64.70%)	66,843 (35.30%)	
1992	Initiative 43	An initiative to authorize the death penalty for local inmates convicted of first-degree murder	Failed	66,303 (32.86%)	135,465 (67.14%)	
1993	Initiative 37	An initiative calling for the United States and former members of the USSR to denuclearize and direct funding towards human services	Passed	41,702 (56.26%)	32,422 (43.74%)	
1994	Initiative 49	An initiative limiting the mayor, councilmembers, and school board members to two consecutive terms	Passed; repealed	83,865 (62.00%)	52,116 (38.00%)	
1996	Initiative 51	An initiative to allow residents to challenge commercial property assessments	Failed	110,523 (80.00%)	27,982 (20.00%)	
1998	Initiative 59	An initiative to legalize the possession, cultivation, and distribution of cannabis for medical reasons	Passed; temporarily blocked (Note: Initiative was rendered invalid by Congress before ballots were cast. A congressional rider blocked implementation of this measure until 2009.)	75,536 (69.00%)	34,621 (31.00%)	
2000	Charter Amendment 3	A charter amendment reducing the size of the State Board of Education from eleven members to nine members	Passed	20,511 (51.00%)	19,668 (49.00%)	
2002	Initiative 62	An initiative to allow some nonviolent drug offenders to go through a treatment program rather than drug courts	Passed	86,162 (78.17%)	24,063 (21.83%)	
2010	Proposed Charter Amendment IV	A referendum to make the D.C. attorney general position an elected office	Passed	90,316 (75.78%)	28,868 (24.22%)	
2012	Charter Amendment V	Council may, by a 5/6 vote, expel a Councilmember.	Passed	22,452 (85.94%)	36,883 (14.06%)	
2012	Charter Amendment VI	Makes ineligible to serve any Councilmember convicted of a felony while in office	Passed	204,986 (77.61%)	59,144 (22.39%)	
2012	Charter Amendment VII	Makes ineligible to serve any Mayor convicted of a felony while in office	Passed	206,813 (78.35%)	57,132 (21.65%)	
2013	Proposed Charter Amendment VIII	A referendum to grant Washington, D.C., budget autonomy from the United States federal budget	Passed	46,788 (86.33%)	7,411 (13.67%)	
2014	Initiative 71	An initiative to legalize the possession and cultivation of cannabis for personal use in small amounts	Passed; partially blocked	115,050 (70.06%)	49,168 (29.94%)	
2016	Advisory Referendum B	A referendum approving a state constitution and encouraging the D.C. Council to petition Congress to admit the District of Columbia as the 51st state	Passed	244,134 (78.48%)	40,779 (13.11%)	
2018	Initiative 77	An initiative to increase the minimum wage for tipped employees to the same level as non-tipped employees	Passed; repealed	47,230 (55.74%)	37,504 (44.26%)	
2020	Initiative 81	An initiative to require police to treat entheogenic plants and fungi as a lowest-priority offense, a form of effective decriminalization	Passed	214,685 (76.18%)	67,140 (23.82%)	
2022	Initiative 82	An initiative to increase the minimum wage for tipped employees to the same level as non-tipped employees	Passed	132,925 (73.94%)	46,861 (26.06%)	
2024	Initiative 83	An initiative that would permit ranked-choice voting and open the primary elections to independent voters.	Passed	212,332 (72.89%)	78,961 (27.11%)	
2026	Initiative 86	An initiative that would prohibit the force-feeding of birds, and ban the sale or distribution of any product resulting from force-feeding a bird, including foie gras	Passed	124,296 (73.22%)	45,457 (26.78%)	
