= Initiative 82 =

2022 Washington, D.C., ballot measure

- An initiative to increase the minimum wage for tipped employees to the same level as non-tipped employees.

Results
Choice	Votes	%
Yes	132,925	73.94%
No	46,861	26.06%
Valid votes	179,786	100.00%
Invalid or blank votes	25,723	14.31%
Total votes	179,786	100.00%
Precinct results
Yes
80–90%
70–80%
60–70%
50–60%

Initiative 82 was a voter-approved ballot initiative in Washington, D.C., to phase out the special minimum wage for tipped employees as part of the national Fight for $15 campaign. In the November 2022 general election, D.C. voters approved Initiative 82 by a margin of 74% to 26%, though about 12% of all participating voters did not vote on the initiative. It was nearly identical to Initiative 77, a ballot measure in the 2018 primary election that was approved by D.C. voters but later overturned by the D.C. Council before it could enter into force.

Initiative 82 passed its 30-day legislative review period and became law on February 23, 2023, however on January 17, 2023, the DC Council voted to delay the first pay increase until May 1, 2023.

== Background ==
On Monday, June 22, 2021, Ryan O'Leary, a former restaurant worker, submitted the legislative text for the Full Minimum Wage for Tipped Workers Amendment Act at the DC Board of Elections with the goal of the Initiative to appearing on the June 2022 Primary election ballot. On Thursday, August 26, 2021, the DC Board of Elections conducted their "subject matter" hearing and voted that the Initiative could go forward and begin the ballot access phase. On Wednesday, October 13, 2021, at the regular meeting of the DC Board of Elections, the Board approved the revised short title and summary statement, and the petition form for Initiative 82, now known as the District of Columbia Tip Credit Elimination Act of 2022.

Initiative 82 would gradually increase the tipped minimum hourly wage from the $5.05 in 2021 to at least $17.50, matching the non-tipped minimum wage in 2027. Although some DC restaurants voluntarily have stopped accepting tips and instead have begun paying their servers at or above minimum wage in the aftermath of Initiative 77, tipping would still be allowed under the new rules.

Although the DC Board of Elections approved the Initiative to appear on the primary election ballot, opponents argued that the Board committed errors in verifying signatures and filed a lawsuit in D.C. Superior Court to keep the measure off the ballot. The opponents ultimately lost their original lawsuit and appeals in early September, 2022, allowing the Initiative to appear on the general election ballot.

== Political arguments ==
=== For ===
- Employers have too much power over tipped employees, and it results in wage theft. Major restaurants that do business in the district have settled lawsuits that made allegations of wage theft.
- The tipped minimum wage extends far beyond bartenders and waitstaff, for example nail stylists, landscapers, valets, cab drivers, bellhops, massage therapists, and housecleaners, among others. These workers are disproportionally women, people of color, living in poverty, and are often not tipped the same as bartenders and waitstaff.
- Tipped workers have to tolerate inappropriate behavior from customers, including sexual harassment, to avoid a reduction in tips. The majority of tipped workers in D.C. reported having experienced sexual harassment while at work.
- The tipped minimum wage is a legacy of slavery. While tipping existed before the abolition of slavery, employers in the railroad and restaurant industries – where formerly enslaved African Americans worked – used the practice to keep their wages low.

=== Against ===
- Tipped wages keep business's operating costs down, especially for bars and restaurants, which can have tiny profit margins. Eliminating the wage means that businesses will either generate less profit or raise their prices to address the new costs.
- Tips enable a worker to earn much more than the minimum wage, while never making less than it. Opponents argue that customers will stop tipping since they believe that workers are earning a suitable wage. Workers who were making more than the minimum wage on average will see their incomes decrease. Supporters pointed out that in all jurisdictions where the tipped minimum wage was abolished, there was no change in established tipping practices.
- Most tipped workers who publicly spoke about eliminating the tipped minimum wage have been in the opposition. However, supporters argue that tipped workers in support fear retaliation from their employers, who are mostly in opposition, and do not express their support publicly.

== Support and opposition ==
The campaign committee behind the Initiative was the D.C. Committee to Build A Better Restaurant Industry, which raised $461,854.65 in donations, which were mostly used for collecting sufficient signatures to appear on the ballot. The largest contributions to the campaign were from Open Society Policy Center, Dr. Bronner's Magic Soaps, and Mintwood Strategies.

The campaign committee against the initiative was called No to 82 and was run out of the K Street office of the Restaurant Association of Metropolitan Washington. The opposition campaign received $685,622.70 in contributions from the National Restaurant Association, Darden Restaurants, Starr Restaurants, Lettuce Entertain You Enterprises, Brinker International, Farmers Restaurant Group, as well as other trade groups, and a number of restaurants located in DC.

Although Initiative 77 was overruled by the council, the Washington City Paper reported that, due to changes in membership, a majority of members said they would not vote to overturn it, so "Initiative 82 looks safe should voters approve it in November". However, before the Initiative completed its congressional review period, the DC Council voted to delay the first pay raise until May 1, 2023.

== Pay raises ==
The District of Columbia's Fair Shot Minimum Wage Emergency Amendment Act of 2016 gradually increased both the standard and tipped minimum wages each July until July 2020, when they eventually equaled $15 and $5, respectively. Each year since, the minimum wages have increased in proportion to any increases in the local consumer price index.

On May 1, 2023, the first pay raise for tipped workers went into effect. The second tipped wage increase took place two months later on July 1, 2023, and will increase $2.00 annually until July 1, 2026. The final tipped wage increase is scheduled to take place on July 1, 2027, and due to the variability of the consumer price index, the exact increase needed to achieve parity will not be determined until January 2027. However, based on the 2025 minimum wage, the final tipped wage increase on July 1, 2027 will be at least $3.95.

On June 3, 2025, the DC Council passed emergency legislation to pause the $2 pay raise scheduled to take place on July 1, 2025 for 90 days.

Ref
Year	Tipped Minimum Wage	Increase	Minimum Wage (Indexed to Inflation)	Difference Between the Tipped Wage and Minimum Wage
1/1/2023	$5.35	$0.00	$16.10	$10.75
5/1/2023	$6.00	$0.65	$16.10	$10.10
7/1/2023	$8.00	$2.00	$17.00	$9.00
7/1/2024	$10.00	$2.00	$17.50	$7.50
7/1/2025	$10.00	$2.00	$17.95 (Current)	$7.95
7/1/2026	$14.00	$2.00	At least $17.95	At least $3.95
7/1/2027	At least $17.95	At least $3.95	At least $17.95	$0.00

The information listed in the table above is based on the latest information from the Office of Wage-Hour Compliance and the legislative text of the Initiative.

On July 1, 2027, the tipped wage will be eliminated in the District of Columbia and there will be one minimum wage for all workers. The exact minimum wage will not be known until January 2027.

== Vote ==
Initiative 82, officially presented as the "District of Columbia Tip Credit Elimination Act of 2021," had the following description on ballots:

Under current law, employers of employees classified as "tipped workers" may take a credit against tipped wages received by workers to satisfy the minimum wage guaranteed to all workers by law. If enacted, the Initiative would gradually eliminate the credit, such that the mandatory base wage (currently $5.05 per hour, indexed to inflation) paid by employers shall increase until 2027, when the mandatory base wage matches the minimum wage established by District of Columbia law (currently $15.20 per hour, indexed to inflation). Tips continue as property of employees and will be in addition to the statutory minimum hourly wage.

On November 8, 2022, in the general election, D.C. voters approved the measure with 73.94% of valid votes, a margin of nearly 50%. Over 25,000 voters, more than 12% of all voters that participated, chose to leave the question blank.

Initiative 82
Choice	Votes	%
For	132,925	73.94
Against	46,861	26.06
Total	179,786	100.00
Valid votes	179,786	87.48
Invalid/blank votes	25,723	12.52
Total votes	205,509	100.00
Registered voters/turnout	504,815	40.71
Source: District of Columbia Board of Elections

== See also ==
- Minimum wage in the United States
