= Initiative 77 =

2018 Washington, D.C., ballot measure

- Minimum Wage Increase for Tipped Workers

Results
Choice	Votes	%
Yes	47,230	55.74%
No	37,504	44.26%
Valid votes	84,734	100.00%
Invalid or blank votes	0	0.00%
Total votes	84,734	100.00%
Precinct results
Yes
80–90%
70–80%
60–70%
50–60%
No
60–70%
50–60%
Other
Tie

Initiative 77 was a voter-approved ballot initiative in Washington, D.C., to phase out the special minimum wage for tipped employees as part of the national Fight for $15 campaign. In the June 2018 primary election, D.C. voters approved Initiative 77 by a margin of 56% to 44%; however, the D.C. Council repealed the initiative in October before it could enter into force. In 2022, a nearly identical Initiative 82 was passed by voters on November 8, 2022, and went into effect the following year.

== Background ==
In 2014, Restaurant Opportunities Center United, a nonprofit organization that advocates for restaurant workers in the United States, said it would ask voters in Washington, D.C., to approve a local ballot measure – Initiative 74 – that would gradually increase the minimum wage to $15 by 2019. It would also increase the tipped minimum wage until it equals the standard wage, which would take place in 2024. The campaign failed to collect the number of signatures required to put the initiative on the ballot.

The next year, the campaign was revived as Initiative 76. More than 70% of D.C. residents supported it, according to a poll conducted by DC Vote and the Washington City Paper. Harry Wingo, then the president of the D.C. Chamber of Commerce, sued the District of Columbia Board of Elections in an effort to prevent the initiative from appearing on the 2016 ballot. He eventually failed.

Muriel Bowser, the mayor of the District of Columbia, was initially skeptical of Initiative 76. However, in a surprise announcement at a citywide address, she announced her full support of the Fight for $15, saying, "Low wages create an invisible ceiling that prevents working families from truly getting a fair shot." Motivated by the impending ballot measure and pressure from labor unions and the restaurant industry, she proposed a compromise piece of legislation that would increase the standard minimum wage from $10.50 per hour to $15 per hour, but allow the tipped minimum wage to remain, albeit substantially increased from $2.77 per hour. The bill was passed unanimously by the D.C. Council in 2016.

Minimum hourly wage changes per the Fair Shot Minimum Wage Emergency Amendment Act of 2016
Effective date	Standard	Tipped
July 1, 2016	$11.50	$2.77
July 1, 2017	$12.50	$3.33
July 1, 2018	$13.25	$3.89
July 1, 2019	$14.00	$4.45
July 1, 2020	$15.00	$5.00
July 1, 2021	$15.20	$5.05
July 1, 2022	$16.10	$5.35
Source: DC Wage Law

The Fair Shot Minimum Wage Emergency Amendment Act of 2016 gradually increased both the standard and tipped minimum wages each July until July 2020, when they would equal $15 and $5, respectively. Each year following, the minimum wages would increase in proportion to any increases in the local consumer price index.

Restaurant Opportunities Center United was dissatisfied with the compromise, saying "We oppose any deal or compromise that excludes tipped workers from a full $15 minimum wage."

== Political arguments ==
=== For ===
- Employers have too much power over tipped employees, and it results in wage theft. Major restaurants that do business in the district have settled lawsuits that made allegations of wage theft.
- The tipped minimum wage extends far beyond bartenders and waitstaff, for example nail stylists, landscapers, valets, cab drivers, bellhops, massage therapists, and housecleaners, among others. These workers are disproportionally women, people of color, living in poverty, and are often not tipped the same as bartenders and waitstaff.
- Tipped workers have to tolerate inappropriate behavior from customers, including sexual harassment, to avoid a reduction in tips. The majority of tipped workers in D.C. reported having experienced sexual harassment while at work.
- The tipped minimum wage is a legacy of slavery. While tipping existed before the abolition of slavery, employers in the railroad and restaurant industries – where formerly enslaved African Americans worked – used the practice to keep their wages low.

=== Against ===
- Tipped wages keep business's operating costs down, especially for bars and restaurants, which can have tiny profit margins. Eliminating the wage means that businesses will either generate less profit or raise their prices to address the new costs.
- Tips enable a worker to earn much more than the minimum wage, while never making less than it. Opponents argue that customers will stop tipping since they believe that workers are earning a suitable wage. Workers who were making more than the minimum wage on average will see their incomes decrease. Supporters pointed out that in all jurisdictions where the tipped minimum wage was abolished, there was no change in established tipping practices.
- Most tipped workers who publicly spoke about eliminating the tipped minimum wage have been in the opposition. However, supporters argue that tipped workers in support fear retaliation from their employers, who are mostly in opposition, and do not express their support publicly.

== Support and opposition ==
The Restaurant Opportunities Center United, a New York-based nonprofit group, led the effort to remove the exemption. The National Restaurant Association and others supported the grassroots organization "Save Our Tips" to keep the existing system in place.

The Washington Post, Mayor Muriel Bowser, many restaurant owners, and the vast majority of DC Councilmembers opposed the initiative. An overwhelming majority of tipped workers opposed the ballot measure and organized themselves to advocate against it.

== Vote ==
On June 19, 2018, in the primary election, D.C. voters approved the measure with 55.74% of valid votes, a margin of more than 10%.

Initiative 77
Choice	Votes	%
For	47,230	55.74
Against	37,504	44.26
Total	84,734	100.00
Valid votes	84,734	94.68
Invalid/blank votes	4,760	5.32
Total votes	89,494	100.00
Registered voters/turnout	479,723	18.66
Source: District of Columbia Board of Elections

== Repeal ==
On July 10, 2018, seven of the thirteen city councillors – Phil Mendelson, Anita Bonds, Jack Evans, Brandon Todd, Kenyan McDuffie, Vincent C. Gray, and Trayon White – introduced the Tipped Wage Workers Fairness Amendment Act of 2018, a bill designed to repeal Initiative 77. Mendelson, the chair of the council, claimed that the measure used misleading language and that he had heard from many tipped workers that opposed the measure. He also cited the fact that voters reelected him knowing his opposition to the measure. Proponents of the initiative, however, pointed out that it had received more popular support and votes than all of the councillors who faced re-election.

The council held hearings about Initiative 77 on September 17. An overwhelming majority of the 243 witnesses who spoke were tipped workers that opposed it. The hearing stretched into the next day, officially ending at 3:20 am.

On October 16, 2018, the D.C. Council voted eight to five in favor of passing the Tipped Wage Workers Fairness Amendment Act of 2018, effectively repealing Initiative 77. David Grosso joined the seven councillors that originally proposed the bill. It was the fifth ballot measure the council had overturned, which last happened in 2001. The bill included last-minute provisions to address the concerns of a tipped minimum wage, including the creation of a hotline to report wage theft, a mandate for businesses to pay its employees using a third party in an attempt to reduce falsified records, and a mandate to train employers of tipped workers on sexual harassment and wage theft. The government had to fund the provisions in order for them to take effect. As late as January 2020, the provisions remained unfunded.

D.C. residents were angered by the repeal, accusing the council of undermining the district's movement for statehood. The council, which is publicly angered when the U.S. Congress overturns its laws, was accused of hypocrisy both by residents and councillors that opposed repealing Initiative 77. Many residents reported to The Washington Post that they felt their votes did not matter, especially in a jurisdiction with already-limited voting rights.

=== Attempted congressional intervention ===
On July 11, 2018, Mark Meadows and Gary Palmer, both Republican members of the U.S. House of Representatives, introduced an amendment to the federal spending bill for 2019 to block Initiative 77 from taking effect, the day after the D.C. Council announced its intention to repeal the initiative. Congress can control the D.C. budget since it is allocated through the federal budget; the amendment stated that "none of the funds made available under [the budget] may be used by the District of Columbia government to carry out [Initiative 77]". Several councillors spoke out against the congressional amendment, including some of those that supported the repeal effort. Eleanor Holmes Norton, the district's nonvoting representative in Congress, also spoke out against the amendment. The amendment did not appear in the final enacted budget bill.

== Initiative 82 ==
A nearly identical ballot initiative known as Initiative 82 was passed by voters in the November 8, 2022 election. It went into effect on May 1, 2023 and will eliminate the District of Columbia's tipped wage on July 1, 2027.

== See also ==
- Minimum wage in the United States
