= Adam Eidinger =

American businessman and activist (born 1973)

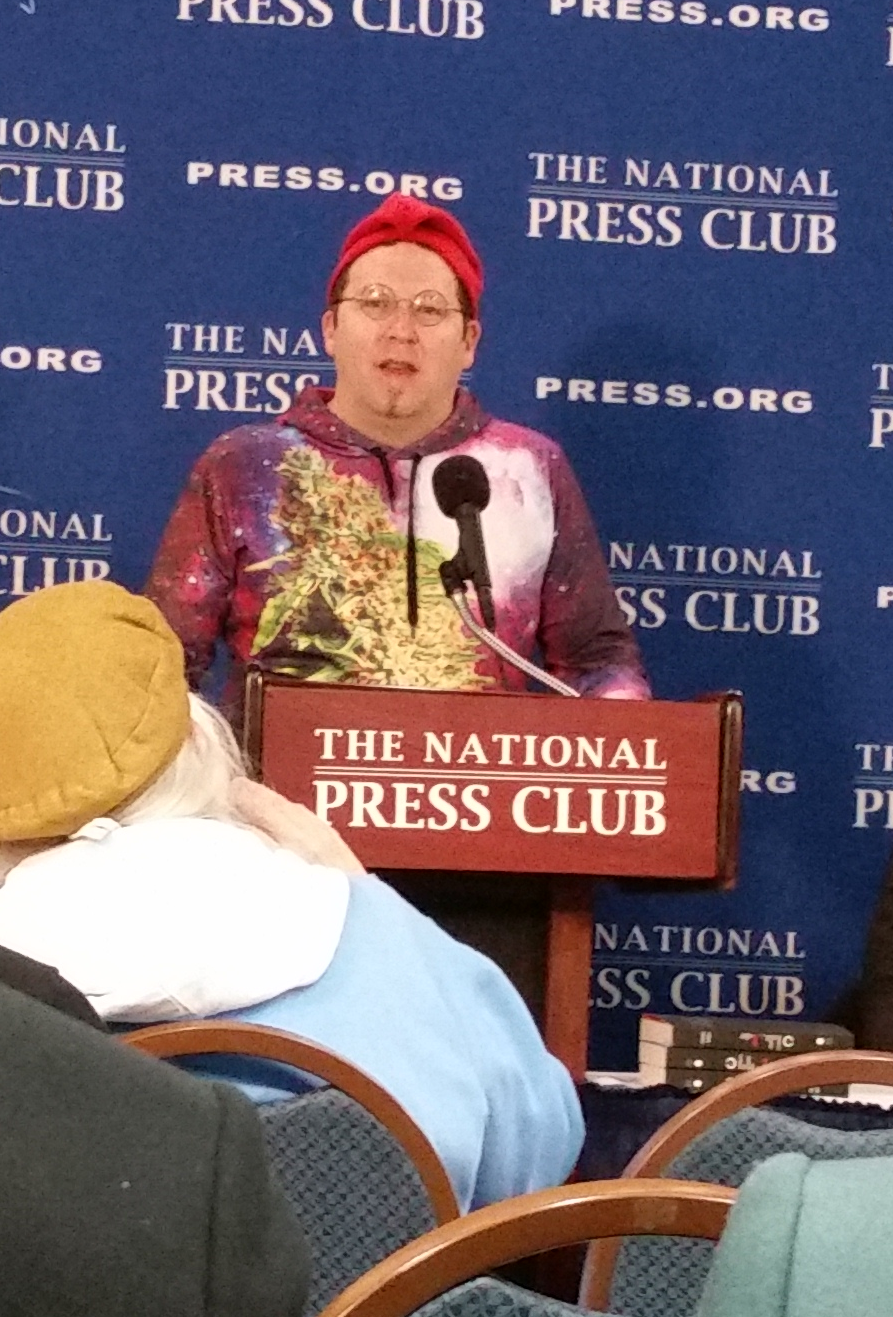
Adam Eidinger at press conference, National Press Club, January 2017

Adam Eidinger (born 1973) is a Washington D.C. businessman and cannabis rights activist, known for his role in spearheading numerous D.C. ballot initiatives, including Initiative 71, which legalized cannabis, Initiative 81, which decriminalized entheogenic plants and fungi, Initiative 82, which eliminated the subminimum wage for tipped workers, and Initiative 83, which authorizes ranked choice voting and opening primary elections to independent voters. He owns and manages the consulting firm Mintwood Strategies.

== Early life ==
Eidinger was born in Pittsburgh in 1973, to a pro-union Democratic family. While at Taylor Allderdice High School, was an Eagle Scout and student council president, and successfully campaigned to have foam trays removed from the lunchroom. He attended American University, majoring in communications (1992–1996), and there organized protests against tuition increases and school president Benjamin Ladner, who was a decade later removed in 2005 for abuse of school funds. Eidinger also served on the school's debate team and cofounded the school's frisbee club, and was arrested for streaking. It was during his first year at American University that Eidinger first tried marijuana, shaping his later political actions.

== Business activities ==
=== Publicist ===
Eidinger initially worked for Rabinowitz Media Strategies following graduation, where he was later fired for his involvement in protest against the IMF, to which some of his employer's clients happened to be tied. In 2000, he founded Mintwood Media Collective, which managed publicity for Dr. Bronner's Soap; Mintwood was retained by Dr. Bronner's in 2001, when the Drug Enforcement Administration was attempting to prevent the importation of hemp, used in Bronner's soap. Mintwood Media closed in 2013 and was reformed as Mintwood Strategies, a sole proprietorship of Eidinger. That year, Movement Media took over publicity duties for Dr. Bronner's.

=== Capitol Hemp ===
Eidinger is co-owner of Capitol Hemp, a store he opened in 2008 in Adams Morgan, selling industrial hemp products such as clothing, food, and shoes. The store and its Chinatown branch were raided by D.C. Metropolitan Police in October 2011 on charges of selling drug paraphernalia; police arrested Eidinger, five employees, and a customer. Eidinger and his business partner agreed to close the stores rather than lose $350,000 in confiscated merchandise and face criminal charges.

In early 2015, following the legalization of marijuana in the District, Eidinger announced his intent to reopen Capitol Hemp at an Adams Morgan location by April of that year.

== Political activism ==
Eidinger has been involved in a wide range of political actions, on District and national issues; a 2014 profile by the Washington Post stated he has been arrested 15 times. Key among his causes have been the marijuana and hemp politics, GMO labeling, anti-war, and social justice.

=== Cannabis ===
==== Hemp Advocacy ====
Eidinger was the publicist for Vote Hemp and the Hemp Industries Association before opening Capitol Hemp. He has been a frequent speaker at Seattle Hempfest. He was instrumental in uncovering the diaries of USDA botanist Lyster Dewey, who grew hemp on the land that is now the Pentagon. In 2009 he was arrested along with other activists for planting hemp seeds in the front lawn of the DEA headquarters in Virginia.

==== Medical Marijuana ====
Eidinger was President of the non-profit organization DC Patients' Cooperative, which was founded in the Spring of 2010 and disbanded in 2012. He, his business partner from Capitol Hemp, and colleague Nikolas Schiller formed the non-profit organization to educate District residents about the medical cannabis law and to apply for a license open a cultivation center and dispensary. Unlike other for-profit groups vying for a license from the DC government, his non-profit organization was more concerned with patient access and affordability. Over the course of the next two years, he helped organize town hall meetings and press conferences to educate the public and urge the District government to move forward with the long-delayed program. The DC Patients' Cooperative ultimately did not apply for a cultivation center or dispensary license because the DC government required applicants to sign a form admitting they were violating federal law. He said the organization decided it wanted nothing to do with a program "that treats us like criminals."

==== Initiative 71 for marijuana legalization ====
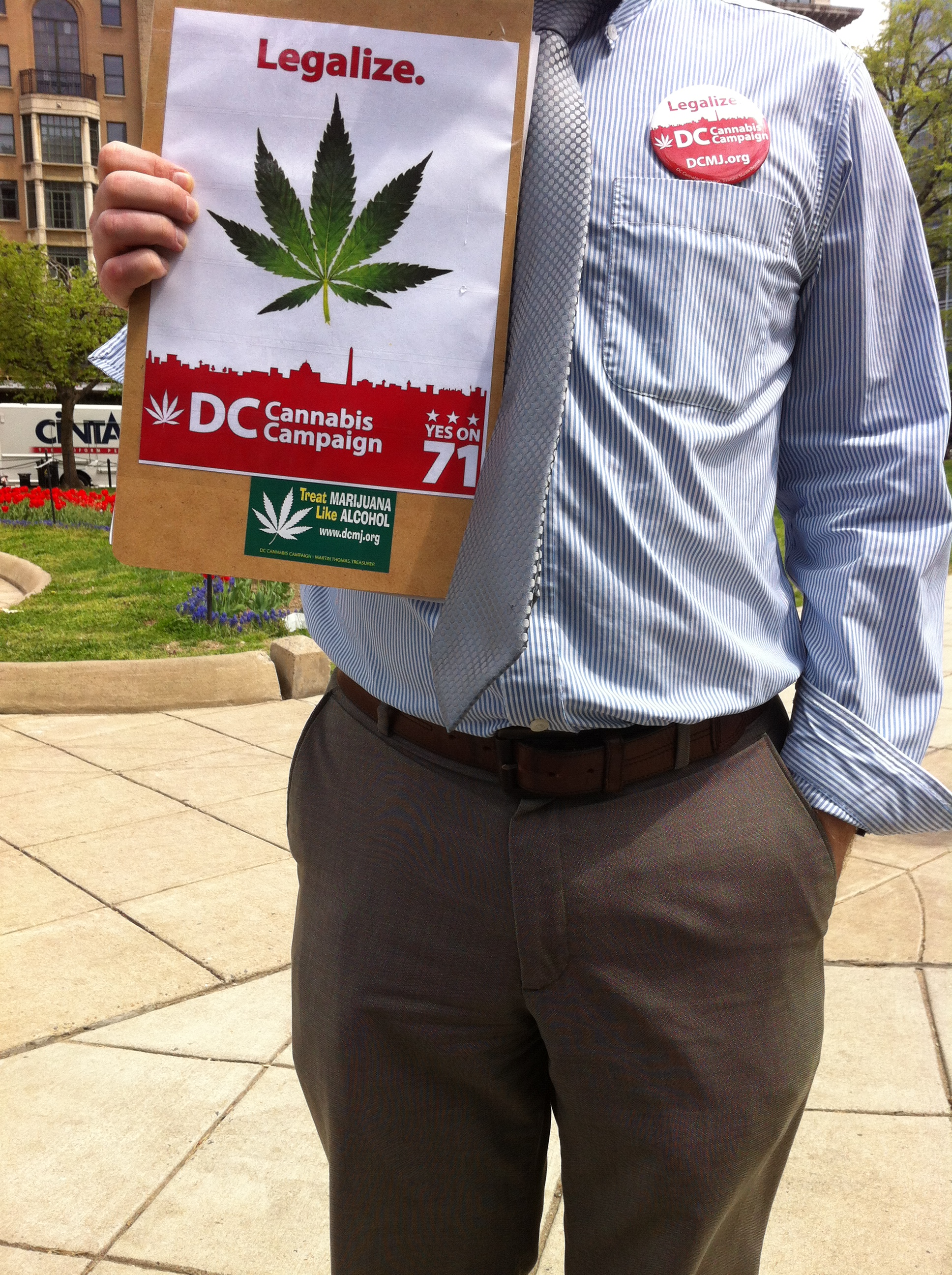
A canvasser for the DC Cannabis Campaign soliciting signatures for Initiative 71

In an interview with the Washington Post, Eidinger attributed his inspiration to legalize marijuana to his experiences in the 2011 raids on Capitol Hemp. In early 2013 Eidinger formed the DCMJ organization to press for decriminalization of marijuana in the District; after seeing no movement from the city council, he submitted initial paperwork for a decriminalization ballot initiative, which was rejected by the city on technical budgetary grounds. Eidinger then refined his initiative, but strengthened it to call for full legalization of marijuana.

The DC Cannabis Campaign's Initiative 71 was approved by the District in April 2014, and went on to gather over 55,000 signatures by the July deadline, assuring the initiative's place on the ballot. The initiative ultimately succeeded, winning with approximately 70% of the vote in the 2014 mayoral election. When Congress attempted to block action on the initiative as part of budget negotiations in 2015, Eidinger led protests in the capital, blocking traffic on Massachusetts Avenue.

Following Initiative 71's taking effect at 12:01 on 26 February 2015, Eidinger publicly smoked a joint and planted hemp seeds before a gathering of national and international press in his home, which also served as campaign headquarters. In March 2015, Mayor Muriel Bowser granted DC license plate number "420" to Eidinger.

==== Cannabis protests ====
On 20 April 2017, Eidinger and six other activists were arrested by U.S. Capitol Police, during a public event where they handed out free cannabis cigarettes to anyone with a Congressional ID badge. Less than a week later, Eidinger was arrested again by Capitol Police on 24 April, along with three other activists, during a "smoke-in" protest on Capitol Hill.

==== Relocation to Maryland ====
In April, 2018, Eidinger rented a home in Salisbury, Maryland in order to help unseat prohibitionist congressman Andy Harris.

=== IMF and World Bank ===
In 2002, Eidinger, a protest leader, was among over 400 people arrested at Pershing Park during a protest against the IMF and World Bank; he was one of seven of those who in 2005 successfully sued the city for wrongful arrest, leading to a $425,000 collective settlement and changes to police procedures. Eidinger had previously been visited by DC police who warned him against his plans for a poster campaign in support of the IMF protests, which he alleged was intimidation.

=== GMO labeling ===
Eidinger has been active in the campaign to label foods with genetically modified ingredients. He was a lead organizer for the Right2Know March, a 300-mile march from Brooklyn to Washington, DC, which took place October 1 to October 16, 2011. At Barack Obama's second inauguration he worked with the activist group Occupy Monsanto to distribute 50 pounds of organic carrots in order to remind the president about his pledge to label genetically modified foods. In the summer of 2013, he organized a nationwide tour of art cars with giant transgenic fish sculptures attached to the roof. The car Fishy Sugar Beet ultimately won Car Talk's World Ugliest Car award.

=== Monsanto ===
Eidinger has been vocal critic of the Monsanto Company and purchased 75 shares to facilitate shareholder activism. In the summer of 2013, he submitted a shareholder resolution written by his colleague Nikolas Schiller, which requested the company issue a report on GMO labeling and the inclusion of Monsanto's patent numbers on food labels. At the 2014 Monsanto shareholder meeting, while his shareholder resolution was being discussed, Eidinger and other activists from Occupy Monsanto blockaded the entrance to Monsanto's campus with the art cars and was arrested. The shareholder resolution ultimately failed, receiving 4.16% of the votes.

During the 2013 government shutdown, he joined activists from Occupy Monsanto and visited the offices of various members of Congress to distribute the fictitious Monsanto Minion Awards. After the awards were distributed, he joined activists who dumped $2,000 from the balcony of the Hart Senate Office Building and was arrested.

=== Shadow Representative runs ===
In 2002 and 2004 he ran as the DC Statehood Green Party candidate for the District of Columbia's Shadow Representative, which is an unpaid position that lobbies Congress to support DC statehood. In 2002 he received 13.9% of the vote and in 2004 he received 12.8% of the vote.

=== Other ===
Eidinger's other protest activities include coordinating the Justice Action Movement in a protest of the inauguration of George W. Bush in 2001, and protests against the District's deal to build a new stadium for the Washington Nationals, where he jumped onto the stage during a press event to announce the team's new name and logo, and seized a microphone to shout "this is a bad deal, people" before being tackled.
