= Nikolas Schiller =

American blogger (born 1980)

- Born: Nikolas Schiller; October 10, 1980 (age 46); Ballwin, St. Louis, Missouri, U.S.
- Known for: Aerial Photography, Digital Art, Cartography
- Movement: Geospatial Art

Nikolas Schiller (born October 10, 1980) is an American blogger and drug policy reform activist who lives in Washington, DC. He is primarily known for developing Geospatial Art, which is the name he gave to his collection of abstract fantasy maps created from kaleidoscopic aerial photographs, and co-founding DCMJ, where he helped write Initiative 71, which legalized the cultivation and possession of small amounts of cannabis in the nation's capital.

== Biography ==
He was born in Saint Louis, Missouri. In 1999 he moved to Washington, D.C. to study geography and computer science at the George Washington University. In 2004 he created a blog called The Daily Render and unlike many people at the time, chose to prevent search engines from accessing the content. Over the next 1000 days he developed and published a unique type of map composed of kaleidescopic aerial photographs. In the lead up to the second inauguration of George W. Bush, he developed one of the first on-line maps of the planned events to use aerial photography. In May 2007 he created a site for image macros of his maps in the vein of the popular LOLcats meme with his website LOLMaps. During the summer of 2007 he created website showing a simulated I.E.D. experience using a "drive" down a street constructed with Google Streetview. At that time he also discovered that the aerial and satellite imagery of downtown Washington, D.C. was purposely out-dated for national security concerns. In the fall of 2007 he designed the record cover for Thievery Corporation's 12" single Supreme Illusion (ESL110), which features aerial photography of the World Trade Center and the Pentagon. In March 2008 he removed the robots exclusion protocols from his blog, which now allows his website to be accessed from all major search engines. In July 2008 he was assaulted on his doorstep by three men, but survived with only a bloody lip. As a blogger, he has worked with writers at Wonkette and the Huffington Post. He currently resides in the Shaw neighborhood of Washington, DC.

== DC Marijuana Justice ==
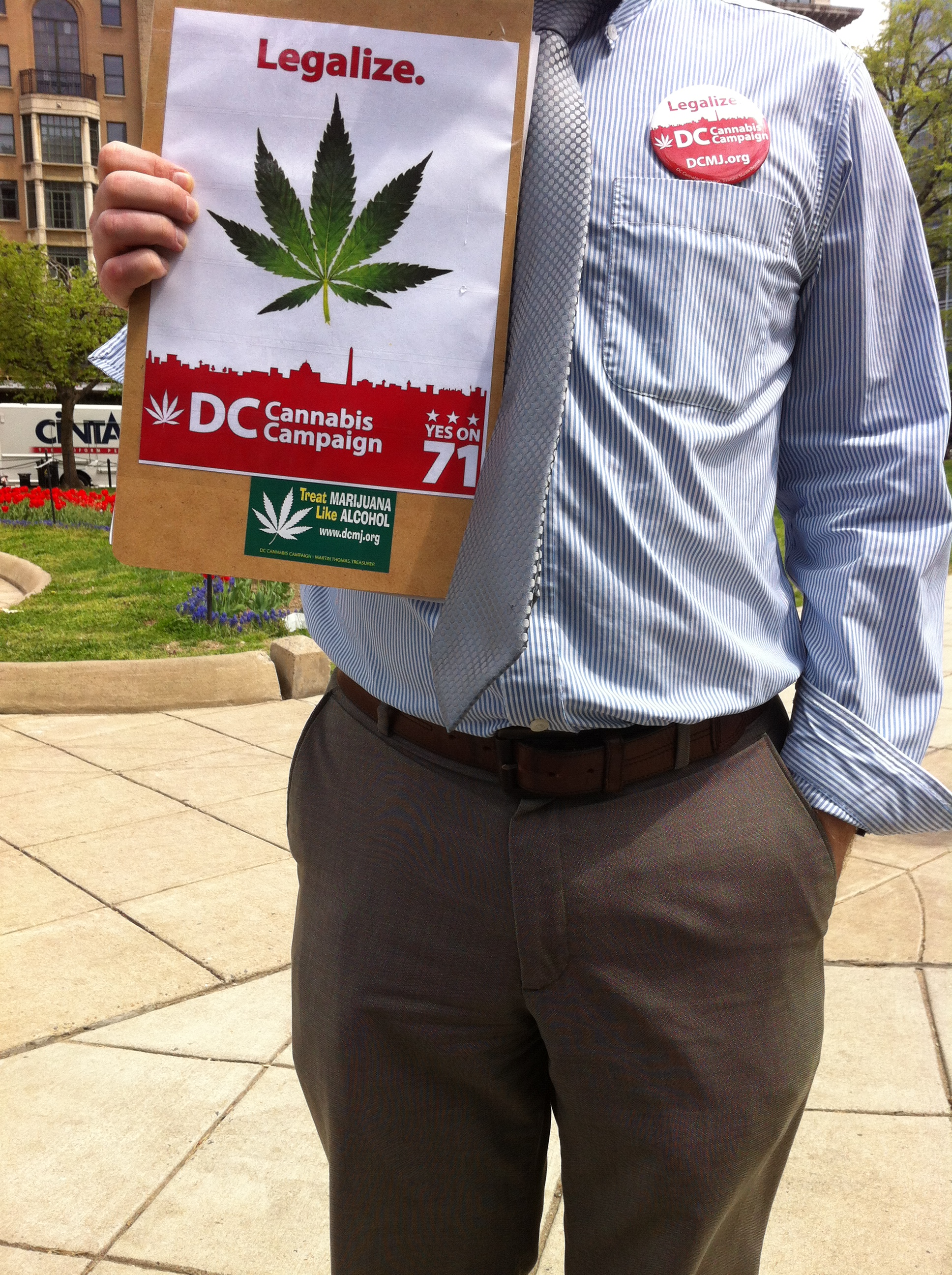
A canvasser for the DC Cannabis Campaign soliciting signatures for Initiative 71

In February 2013, Schiller, along with Adam Eidinger and Alan Amsterdam, co-founded DC Marijuana Justice, colloquially known as DCMJ. the organization submitted their first draft to the District of Columbia Board of Elections. Due to the prohibition of the ballot initiatives from being able to appropriate funds to implement the proposed legislation, the first draft was withdrawn. The second version, which became Initiative 71, was submitted by Adam Eidinger to the DC Board of Elections in early 2014. Schiller served as the campaign's Director of Communications.

Beginning in 2016 his work with DCMJ focused on advocacy related to the removal cannabis from the Controlled Substances Act. DCMJ organized an extremely popular smoke-in outside the White House, which resulted in a meeting with White House staff. Later that year he helped bring two 51' foot long inflatable joints to the Democratic National Convention to "make sure all candidates are for full legalization of cannabis."

After the election of Donald Trump, in early 2017 DCMJ announced that it was going to distribute 4,200 joints at the inauguration in order to highlight that cannabis reform is a non-partisan issue. Calling it #Trump420, over 5,500 joints were rolled prior to the inauguration. By January 20, 2017, over 8,000 joints had been rolled. Schiller helped organize another joint giveaway near the U.S. Capitol, which ultimately resulted in numerous arrests. The following day 6 of the activists had their charges dropped, which allowed DCMJ to come back to the Capitol four days later for a second smoke-in.

In October 2017, DCMJ began their campaign to raise awareness that individuals living in government subsidized housing risk eviction if they are found to have cannabis in their homes.

== Activism ==
Since the beginning of 2004 he has been involved with the DC statehood movement. He was served on the steering committee of the DC Statehood Green Party from 2005 to 2007 and was a delegate to the Green Party of the United States from 2006 to 2007. He has been a vocal critic of DC voting rights legislation that would give residents of the District of Columbia only one vote in the United States House of Representatives. He has created a DC Flag and a DC license plate to express the concept of taxation with one-third representation. He has been known to attend voting rights demonstrations wearing colonial outfits to emphasize the fact that District resident are colonists who suffer from Taxation Without Representation.

In February 2009, under the motto “The United States government operates 24 hours a day, 7 days a week, so should Metro,” he created a Facebook Group called "Washington Metropolitan Area Residents for a 24 Hour Metro" to help lobby for expanded operating hours.

In July 2009 he put up a sign on a street lamp outside of MTV's The Real World house in the Dupont Circle neighborhood of Washington, DC that said IN THE REAL WORLD ALL AMERICANS DESERVE FULL REPRESENTATION IN CONGRESS. In November 2009, while dressed in colonial attire, he was asked to take off his tricorn hat during a Congressional hearing on budget autonomy for the District of Columbia and was briefly detained by the U.S. Capitol Police, but was allowed to return to the hearing after promising to not put the hat back on. As an antiwar activist, he once arranged bricks on the rooftop of his home to spell out NO WAR so that his message would show up on Google Maps.

In January 2010, he co-founded a non-profit organization called the DC Patients' Cooperative, which he hoped would become a licensed medical cannabis dispensary in the District of Columbia. In May 2010, after the Council of the District of Columbia passed legislation to regulate the medical cannabis program, he went on record advocating for more employment protections for qualified patients. In February 2011, he helped organize a town hall meeting to educate the public on the medical cannabis program's regulations. On the one year anniversary of Congress approving the legislation, he helped organize a press conference to call on the District of Columbia government to fully implement the program, allow patients to grow their own medicine, and to establish an affirmative defense for patients. Due to the "glacial pace" and a requirement to sign a legal waiver concerning federal prosecution for participation in the program, he said that the organization is taking a "wait and see" approach instead of applying for a license.

On February 21, 2012, a photo of him in colonial attire appeared in Washington Post columnist Vivek Wadhwa's article America, keep rewarding your dissidents

In the summer of 2013 Schiller began driving an art car around Washington, DC with a sculpture of a genetically modified apple attached to the roof in order to protest the U.S. government's policies on the labeling of genetically modified foods. Named Goldie, the Ford Escort was a part of a fleet of art cars that featured sculptures of a corn cob, soybean, sugar beet, and tomato that were designed to appear cross-bred with a fish to humorously convey the message that unlabeled genetically engineered food was fishy. In August 2013 he drove the car across the United States from Washington, DC to Washington state in order to promote the passage of Ballot Initiative 522.

In 2020, he served as the field director for Initiative 81, a Washington, DC ballot initiative that will make some plant medicines the lowest law enforcement priority. Due to the coronavirus pandemic, the campaign was forced to suspend its operations in the spring. After the Council of the District of Columbia passed legislation allowing the District of Columbia Board of Elections to change ballot access rules, the campaign was able to successfully mail over 200,000 petitions to District of Columbia voters and hire over 150 petition circulators to collect signatures from registered voters outside grocery stores using social distancing in order to successfully qualify for the general election ballot.
