= Initiative 81 =

2020 Washington, DC, ballot measure

- An initiative to require police to treat entheogenic plants and fungi as a lowest-priority offense, a form of effective decriminalization.

Results
Choice	Votes	%
Yes	214,685	76.18%
No	67,140	23.82%
Valid votes	281,825	100.00%
Invalid or blank votes	0	0.00%
Total votes	281,825	100.00%
Precinct results
Yes
80–90%
70–80%
60–70%

Initiative 81 was a voter-approved ballot initiative in Washington, D.C. that changed the police priorities related to the possession, consumption, and cultivation of entheogenic plants and fungi. The short title of the initiative was Entheogenic Plant and Fungus Policy Act of 2020. The measure was approved by 76% of voters on November 3, 2020 and went into effect on March 16, 2021.

== Creation ==
After the birth of her first child, proposer Melissa Lavasani fell into a deep depression and while she was able to persevere by relying on a daily routine, after her second child she began to develop chronic pain and severe postpartum depression. After listening to a Joe Rogan podcast that featured mycologist Paul Stamets, she learned that psilocybin could be used as anti-depressant to treat mental health. She ordered spores over the internet, began to grow them at home, and tried microdosing. She eventually went on to try ayahuasca in 2019 which she says, “it was like I was I turned out to be not only back to myself, but almost like a better version of myself.”

After learning about the effort to decriminalize psychedelic mushrooms in Denver, Lavasani reached out the campaign's organizer, who put her in touch with Adam Eidinger, who had spearheaded Initiative 71 in 2014. After a dinner meeting, Eidinger worked to convince her that she would be effective proposer for the ballot initiative.

On December 20, 2019, Lavasani submitted the final text of ballot initiative at the DC Board of Elections and formally created the Campaign to Decriminalize Nature DC. The subject matter hearing took place on Wednesday, February 5, 2020 and at the hearing the DC Board of Elections approved the ballot initiative's language.

== Petition gathering ==
Due the COVID-19 pandemic, the Council of the District of Columbia changed the way political campaigns were allowed to collect signatures to achieve ballot access. For the first time, voters were able to submit completed petitions through the mail or electronically. Nikolas Schiller, the campaign's field director, said there were over 7,000 petitions that were returned by mail. Between May and July, approximately 60 days, the campaign collected more than 36,000 signatures from voters. On August 5, 2020, the DC Board of Elections verified that 25,477 signatures, 642 more than what was legally required, were properly submitted, which placed the initiative on the general election ballot.

== Opposition in Congress ==
The initiative was opposed by Maryland Congressman Andy Harris, who vowed to force a House Appropriations Committee vote to take it off the ballot. He later filed an amendment to make the law only apply to medically prescribed psilocybin, but withdrew it.

== Election ==
Initiative 81
Choice	Votes	%
For	214,685	76.18
Against	67,140	23.82
Total	281,825	100.00
Registered voters/turnout	517,890	54.41%

Source: DC Board of Elections

== Completion ==
The congressional review period ended at 12:01 a.m. on March 16, 2021. The measure makes the enforcement of drug laws against psilocybin mushrooms and psychedelic plants like cacti, iboga, and naturally occurring DMT, found in preparations like ayahuasca, to be among the Metropolitan Police Department's lowest priorities. The measure also calls upon Attorney General for the District of Columbia and the United States Attorney for the District of Columbia to cease prosecution of residents of the District of Columbia for activities associated with those natural plant medicines.

== See also ==
- Initiatives and referendums in the District of Columbia
- Psilocybin decriminalization in the United States
- Decriminalize Nature
