= List of Washington ballot measures =

List of Washington ballot measures may refer to:

- List of Washington (state) ballot measures
- List of Washington, D.C., ballot measures
