= Two Is Enough D.C. =

2014 anti-cannabis legalization group

Two Is Enough D.C. (T.I.E. D.C.) was the main opposition campaign to Initiative 71, which succeeded in legalizing cannabis in the District of Columbia by ballot initiative in 2014. The campaign was announced in September 2014 by DC resident Will Jones III, at a news conference featuring former Senator Patrick Kennedy, founder of Smart Approaches to Marijuana. At the event, Jones publicly invited pro-71 activist Adam Eidinger to a public debate on the issue. In response to questions as to why the campaign was beginning less than two months before the election, Jones stated "We should have organized earlier... but it's better to start late than never.

As of late October 2014, the movement had raised $3,838 in funding, almost all of which was spent on bus ads in Southeast DC, one of which was criticized for misspelling "edibles". The movement was criticized for failing to register with the Office of Campaign Finance in a timely manner, though Jones had registered his website and begun attending meetings in July.
