= Timeline of cannabis laws in the United States =

Legality of cannabis in the United States Legal for recreational use Legal for medical use No comprehensive medical program ● Decriminalized Notes: · Reflects laws of states and territories, including laws which have not yet gone into effect. Does not reflect federal, tribal, or local laws. · Map does not show state legality of hemp-derived cannabinoids such as CBD or delta-8-THC, which have been legal at federal level since enactment of the 2018 Farm Bill.

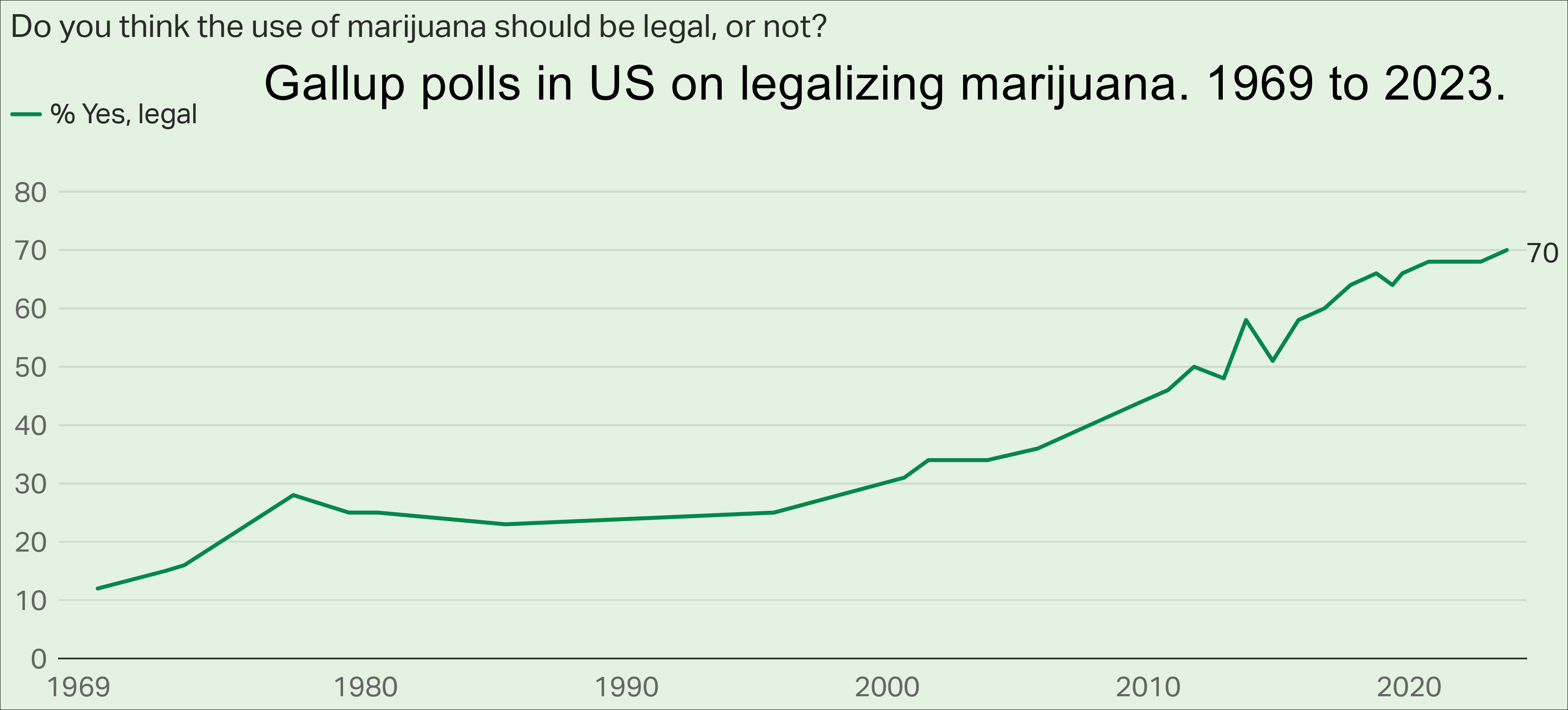
Timeline of Gallup polls in US on legalizing marijuana. See data table below.

Gallup polls. Do you think the use of marijuana should be legal, or not?
Date	% Yes, legal
10/2/2023	70
10/3/2022	68
10/1/2021	68
10/1/2020	68
10/1/2019	66
5/15/2019	64
10/1/2018	66
10/5/2017	64
10/5/2016	60
10/7/2015	58
10/12/2014	51
10/3/2013	58
11/26/2012	48
10/6/2011	50
10/7/2010	46
10/1/2009	44
10/13/2005	36
11/10/2003	34
8/3/2001	34
8/29/2000	31
8/28/1995	25
5/17/1985	23
6/27/1980	25
5/18/1979	25
4/1/1977	28
1/26/1973	16
5/3/1972	15
10/2/1969	12

The legal history of cannabis in the United States began with state-level prohibition in the early 20th century, with the first major federal limitations occurring in 1937. Starting with Oregon in 1973, individual states began to liberalize cannabis laws through decriminalization. In 1996, California became the first state to legalize medical cannabis, sparking a trend that spread to a majority of states by 2016. In 2012, Washington and Colorado became the first states to legalize cannabis for recreational use.

== Federal ==
- 1937: The Marihuana Tax Act is enacted, effectively prohibiting cannabis at the federal level. Although medical use is still permitted, new fees and regulatory requirements significantly curtail its use.
- 1969: The Marihuana Tax Act is struck down in the case Leary v. United States. The Supreme Court rules that the act violates the Fifth Amendment's protection against self-incrimination.
- 1970: The Controlled Substances Act is enacted. Cannabis is classified as a Schedule I drug, determined to have a high potential for abuse and no accepted medical use, thereby prohibiting its use for any purpose.
- 1979: DEA creates Domestic Cannabis Eradication / Suppression Program to destroy marijuana plants by incineration.
- 1985: Marinol is prescribed for the first time
- 1990: The Solomon–Lautenberg amendment is enacted. As a result, many states pass "Smoke a joint, lose your license" laws under which any drug offense is punished with a mandatory six month driver's license suspension.
- 2014: The Rohrabacher–Farr amendment passes the U.S. House and is signed into law. Requiring annual renewal, it prohibits the Justice Department from interfering with the implementation of state medical cannabis laws. The Cole Memorandum had in 2013 assigned similar policies from within the Justice Department.
- 2016: The ATF adds marijuana to Form 4473
- 2018: The 2018 farm bill legalizes low-THC (less than 0.3% THC) hemp and hemp-derived products such as cannabidiol (CBD) at the federal level. The bill also fully removed or "descheduled" low-THC cannabis products from the Controlled Substances Act, where they had been listed as Schedule I drugs since the CSA's inception in 1970.
- 2022: The Medical Marijuana and Cannabidiol Research Expansion Act is signed into law to allow cannabis to be more easily researched for medical purposes. It is the first standalone cannabis reform bill enacted at the federal level.

== State ==
=== Prohibition begins – 1911 ===
- 1911: Massachusetts requires a prescription for sales of Indian hemp.
- 1913: California, Maine, Wyoming, and Indiana ban marijuana.
- 1915: Utah and Vermont ban marijuana.
- 1917: Colorado legislators make the use and cultivation of cannabis a misdemeanor.
- 1923: Iowa, Oregon, Washington, and Vermont ban marijuana.
- 1927: New York, Idaho, Kansas, Montana, and Nebraska ban marijuana.
- 1931: Illinois bans marijuana.
- 1931: Texas declares cannabis a narcotic, allowing up to life sentences for possession.
- 1933: North Dakota and Oklahoma ban marijuana. By this year, 29 states have criminalized cannabis.

=== Decriminalization begins – 1973 ===
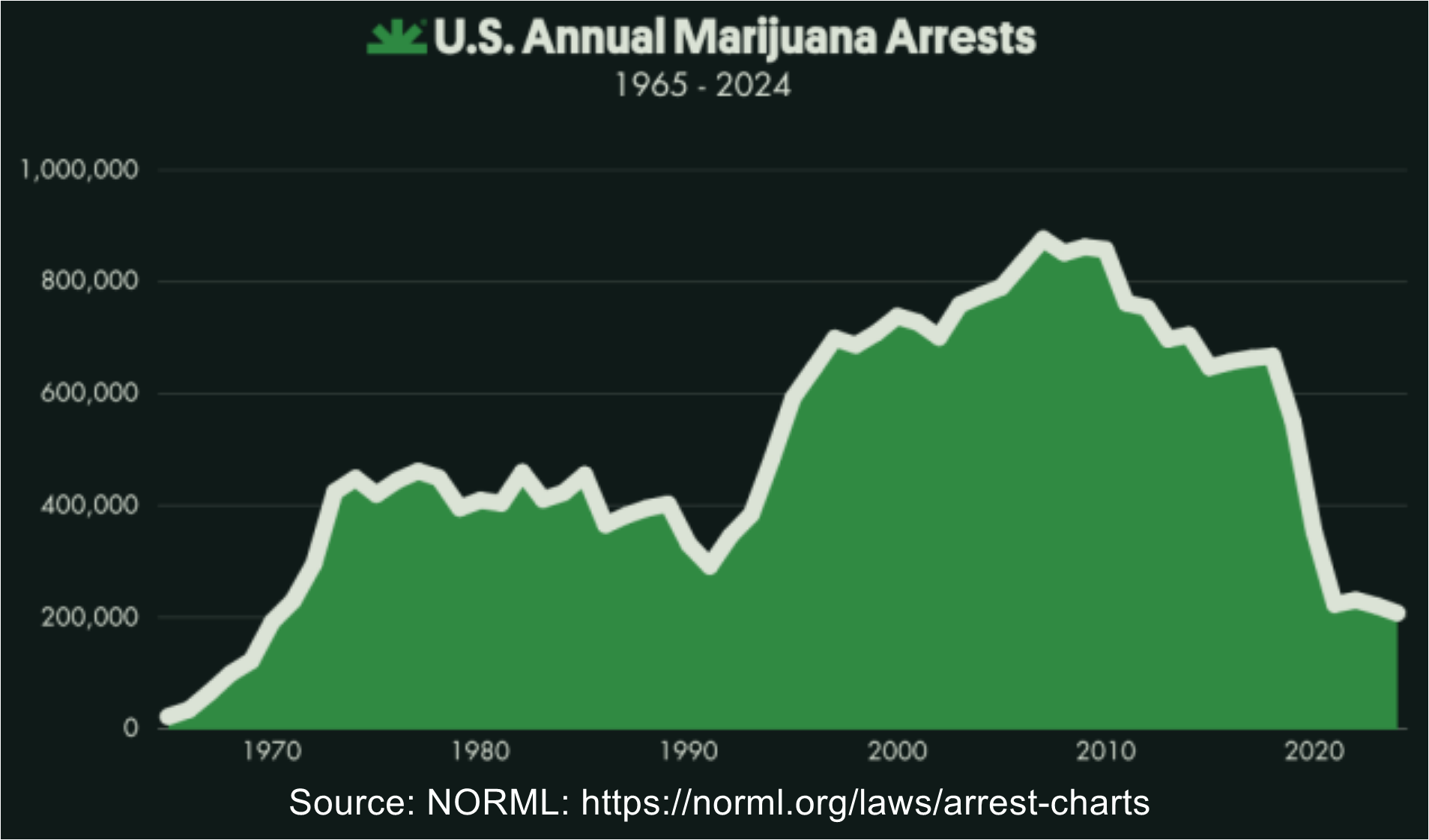
US annual marijuana arrests. NORML.

- 1973: Texas law is amended to declare possession of four ounces or less a misdemeanor.
- 1973: Oregon becomes the first state to decriminalize cannabis – reducing the penalty for up to one ounce to a $100 fine.
- 1975: Alaska, Maine, Colorado, California, and Ohio decriminalize cannabis.
- 1975: Alaska's Supreme Court establishes that the right to privacy includes possession of small amounts of marijuana.
- 1976: Minnesota decriminalizes cannabis.
- 1977: Mississippi, New York, and North Carolina decriminalize cannabis. South Dakota also decriminalizes cannabis, but the law is repealed almost immediately afterwards.
- 1978: Nebraska decriminalizes cannabis. No other state would decriminalize until 2001.
- 1978: New Mexico passes the Controlled Substances Therapeutic Research Act, becoming the first state to enact legislation recognizing the medical value of marijuana.
- 1979: Virginia passes legislation allowing doctors to recommend cannabis for glaucoma or the side effects of chemotherapy.
- 1982: Alaska passes legislation to further decrease penalties for cannabis.
- 1990: Alaska recriminalizes cannabis by voter initiative, restoring criminal penalties for possession of any amount of cannabis.

=== Medical cannabis begins – 1996 ===
- 1996: California becomes the first state to legalize medical cannabis with the approval of Proposition 215. Arizona also passes a medical cannabis ballot measure, but it is rendered ineffective on a technicality.
- 1998: Oregon, Alaska, and Washington all legalize medical cannabis through ballot measure. Nevada also passes a medical cannabis initiative, but it requires second approval in 2000 to become law, as per the state constitution.
- 1999: Maine legalizes medical cannabis through ballot measure.
- 2000: Hawaii becomes the first state to legalize medical cannabis through state legislature.
- 2000: Nevada and Colorado legalize medical cannabis through ballot measure.
- 2001: Nevada decriminalizes cannabis through state legislature.
- 2003: Maryland passes legislation establishing reduced penalties for persons using cannabis due to a medical necessity (as established at trial).
- 2004: Vermont legalizes medical cannabis through state legislature.
- 2004: Montana legalizes medical cannabis through ballot measure.
- 2006: Rhode Island legalizes medical cannabis through state legislature.
- 2007: New Mexico legalizes medical cannabis through state legislature.
- 2008: Michigan approves a ballot initiative to legalize medical cannabis. Massachusetts approves a ballot measure to decriminalize cannabis.
- 2010: New Jersey legalizes medical cannabis through state legislature.
- 2010: Arizona legalizes medical cannabis through ballot measure.
- 2010: California legislators reduce penalties for cannabis to a civil infraction.
- 2011: Delaware legalizes medical cannabis through state legislature.
- 2011: Connecticut decriminalizes cannabis through state legislature.
- 2012: Connecticut legalizes medical cannabis through state legislature.
- 2012: Rhode Island decriminalizes cannabis through state legislature.

=== Recreational legalization begins – 2012 ===
- 2012: Colorado and Washington become the first two states to legalize the recreational use of cannabis following the passage of Amendment 64 and Initiative 502. Massachusetts approves a ballot measure to legalize medical cannabis.
- 2013: Vermont decriminalizes cannabis through state legislature.
- 2013: New Hampshire legalizes medical cannabis through state legislature.
- 2013: Illinois legalizes medical cannabis through state legislature.
- 2014: Utah becomes the first state to pass a low-THC, high-CBD medical cannabis law. These laws allow low-THC cannabis oil to be used for treatment of certain medical conditions (mostly seizure disorders) with a doctor's recommendation.
- 2014: Maryland legislators decriminalize cannabis and approve a comprehensive medical cannabis law, expanding the very limited measure that was passed in 2003.
- 2014: Missouri decriminalizes cannabis through state legislature.
- 2014: Minnesota legalizes medical cannabis through state legislature.
- 2014: New York legalizes medical cannabis through state legislature.
- 2014: Alaska and Oregon legalize recreational cannabis through ballot measure.
- 2014: By the end of the year, 10 more states pass low-THC, high-CBD medical cannabis laws: Alabama, Kentucky, Wisconsin, Mississippi, Tennessee, Iowa, South Carolina, Florida, North Carolina, and Missouri.
- 2015: Delaware decriminalizes cannabis through state legislature.
- 2015: Louisiana legislators pass a limited medical cannabis law.
- 2015: During the year, five more states pass low-THC, high-CBD medical cannabis laws: Virginia, Georgia, Oklahoma, Texas, and Wyoming.
- 2016: Pennsylvania legalizes medical cannabis through state legislature.
- 2016: Ohio legalizes medical cannabis through state legislature.
- 2016: Illinois decriminalizes cannabis through state legislature.
- 2016: California, Nevada, Maine, and Massachusetts approve ballot measures to legalize recreational cannabis. Arkansas, Florida, and North Dakota approve ballot measures to legalize medical cannabis.
- 2017: West Virginia legalizes medical cannabis through state legislature.
- 2017: Indiana passes a low-THC, high-CBD medical cannabis law.
- 2017: New Hampshire decriminalizes cannabis through state legislature.
- 2018: Vermont becomes the first state to legalize recreational cannabis through state legislature. Unlike all other states that had legalized recreational cannabis, however, no provision was made for commercial sale.
- 2018: Indiana legalizes CBD for any use.
- 2018: Kansas legalizes CBD for any use.
- 2018: Oklahoma legalizes medical cannabis through ballot measure.
- 2018: Michigan approves a ballot measure to legalize recreational cannabis. Missouri and Utah approve ballot measures to legalize medical cannabis.
- 2019: New Mexico decriminalizes cannabis through state legislature.
- 2019: North Dakota decriminalizes cannabis through state legislature.
- 2019: Illinois legalizes recreational cannabis through state legislature, including its commercial sale. It became the first state to legalize the commercial sale of recreational cannabis through an act of state legislature.
- 2019: Hawaii decriminalizes cannabis through state legislature.
- 2020: Virginia decriminalizes cannabis through state legislature.
- 2020: Vermont legalizes commercial recreational cannabis sales through state legislature.
- 2020: Arizona, Montana, New Jersey, and South Dakota approve ballot measures to legalize recreational cannabis, with South Dakota becoming the first state to legalize recreational use without first legalizing medical use. Mississippi and South Dakota approve ballot measures to legalize medical cannabis.
- 2021: South Dakota initiative to legalize recreational use is ruled state-unconstitutional by a circuit court judge.
- 2021: New York legalizes recreational cannabis through state legislature.
- 2021: Virginia legalizes recreational cannabis through state legislature.
- 2021: New Mexico legalizes recreational cannabis through state legislature.
- 2021: Mississippi initiative to legalize medical cannabis is overturned by the Supreme Court of Mississippi due to issue with state's ballot initiative process.
- 2021: Alabama legalizes medical cannabis through state legislature.
- 2021: Louisiana decriminalizes cannabis through state legislature.
- 2021: Connecticut legalizes recreational cannabis through state legislature.
- 2022: Mississippi legalizes medical cannabis through state legislature.
- 2022: Rhode Island legalizes recreational cannabis through state legislature.
- 2022: Maryland and Missouri voters approve ballot measures to legalize recreational cannabis.
- 2023: Kentucky legalizes medical cannabis through state legislature.
- 2023: Delaware legalizes recreational cannabis through state legislature.
- 2023: Minnesota legalizes recreational cannabis through state legislature.
- 2023: Ohio legalizes recreational cannabis through Issue 2.
- 2025: Texas legalizes medical cannabis through state legislature.
- 2025: Nebraska legalizes medical cannabis through Initiative 437 after legal issues were resolved.

== Municipal ==
- 1906: Washington, D.C. requires a prescription for cannabis drugs.
- 1915: El Paso, Texas restricts cannabis.
- 1972: Ann Arbor City Council decriminalized cannabis, reducing the penalty to a $5 fine. The law was overturned by a Republican-led council a year later, but reinstated through voter referendum in 1974.
- 1977: Madison, Wisconsin decriminalized cannabis through ballot initiative.
- 1978: San Francisco residents approved Proposition W, a non-binding measure directing city law enforcement to "cease the arrest and prosecution of individuals involved in the cultivation, transfer, or possession of marijuana". Mayor George Moscone was assassinated shortly afterwards, however, and the initiative was disregarded by new mayor Dianne Feinstein.
- 1991: San Francisco residents approved the non-binding Proposition P in support of the medical use of cannabis. The city Board of Supervisors followed with Resolution 141–92 in 1992, which allowed for the distribution of medical cannabis throughout the city.
- 1998: Washington, D.C. residents approved Initiative 59 to legalize medical cannabis, but the Barr amendment blocked implementation until 2009, with the first legal sales finally occurring in 2013.
- 2003: Seattle residents voted to make enforcement of cannabis laws the lowest priority.
- 2004: Oakland, California residents approved Measure Z, making private adult cannabis offenses the lowest possible priority for law enforcement, establishing a system to regulate, tax, and sell cannabis pending state legalization, and urging legalization on the state and national levels.
- 2005: Denver residents voted to legalize cannabis.
- 2006: San Francisco made enforcement of cannabis laws the lowest priority. The change was approved through a Board of Supervisors vote.
- 2009: Breckenridge, Colorado residents voted to legalize cannabis.
- 2012: Chicago decriminalized cannabis through a city council vote.
- 2012: Detroit, Grand Rapids, and Flint residents voted to decriminalize cannabis.
- 2013: Portland, Maine residents voted to legalize cannabis.
- 2014: Philadelphia decriminalized cannabis through a city council vote.
- 2014: After a city council vote decriminalized cannabis in March, Washington D.C. residents voted to approve Initiative 71 in November to legalize recreational use of cannabis and personal cultivation. A congressional rider passed afterwards prevented D.C. City Council from legalizing commercial sales.
- 2014: New York City decriminalized cannabis through a new policy announced by city officials.
- 2015: Wichita, Kansas decriminalized cannabis through voter referendum.
- 2015: Miami-Dade commissioners voted to decriminalize cannabis.
- 2015: Toledo, Ohio residents voted to decriminalize possession of cannabis less than 200 grams (7 oz).
- 2015: Pittsburgh decriminalized cannabis through a city council vote.
- 2016: Tampa decriminalized cannabis through a city council vote.
- 2016: New Orleans decriminalized cannabis through a city council vote.
- 2016: Orlando decriminalized cannabis through a city council vote.
- 2016: Nashville decriminalized cannabis through a Metro Council vote.
- 2016: Memphis decriminalized cannabis through a city council vote.
- 2016: Residents in the Ohio cities of Bellaire, Logan, Newark, and Roseville voted to decriminalize possession of cannabis less than 200 grams (7 oz).
- 2017: Houston decriminalized cannabis through a new policy announced by the city's district attorney.
- 2017: Kansas City, Missouri residents voted to decriminalize cannabis, eliminating jail time for possession of 35 grams (1¼ oz) or less and reducing the penalty to a $25 fine.
- 2017: Atlanta decriminalized possession of one ounce or less of cannabis via unanimous city council vote.
- 2018: Albuquerque decriminalized cannabis through a city council vote.

== Territory ==
- 2014: Guam legalized medical cannabis through ballot measure.
- 2014: The United States Virgin Islands decriminalized cannabis.
- 2015: Puerto Rico legalized medical cannabis by executive order.
- 2018: The Northern Mariana Islands legalized recreational cannabis through an act of legislature.
- 2019: The United States Virgin Islands legalized medical cannabis through an act of legislature.
- 2019: Guam legalized recreational cannabis through an act of legislature.
- 2023: The United States Virgin Islands legalized recreational cannabis through territorial legislature.

== Native American reservations ==
- 2014: The Justice Department announced a policy to allow recognized Native American tribes to legalize cannabis on their reservations, including in states where cannabis remains illegal.
- 2015: The Flandreau Santee Sioux Tribe (South Dakota) voted to legalize recreational cannabis on its reservation.
- 2015: The Squaxin Island Tribe in the Puget Sound area legalized and opened the United States' first tribal retail cannabis sales shop on their trust lands. Suquamish Tribe followed later in the same year.
- 2015: The Pinoleville Pomo Nation in California announced a plan to grow cannabis and sell it to California medical dispensaries.
- 2016: The Puyallup Tribe made legal arrangements with the State of Washington to grow its own medical cannabis.
- 2021: The Eastern Band of Cherokee Indians in North Carolina legalized the possession of up to one ounce of cannabis, through a tribal council vote.
- 2023: The Eastern Band of Cherokee Indians approved a voter referendum directing the tribal council to legalize recreational sales.

== Opinion ==
=== Presidential ===
- 1972: President Richard Nixon opposes the policy of cannabis decriminalization. He states: "I do not believe that you can have effective criminal justice based on a philosophy that something is half legal and half illegal ... despite what the [Shafer Commission] has recommended."
- 1977: President Jimmy Carter endorses legislation to federally decriminalize cannabis, declaring that "Penalties against possession of a drug should not be more damaging to an individual than the use of the drug itself."
- 1980: Presidential candidate Ronald Reagan warns that "Leading medical researchers are coming to the conclusion that marijuana ... is probably the most dangerous drug in the United States."
- 1996: Former Presidents Gerald Ford, Jimmy Carter, and George H. W. Bush urge the defeat of medical cannabis initiatives in California and Arizona, asserting in an open letter that the measures pose "enormous threats" to the public health of all Americans.
- 2000: President Bill Clinton, in an interview with Rolling Stone shortly before leaving office, states his support for decriminalizing cannabis.
- 2015: President Barack Obama declares his support for cannabis decriminalization but opposition to legalization.
- 2022: President Joe Biden, in ordering a review of the scheduling status of cannabis, states: "We classify marijuana at the same level as heroin – and more serious than fentanyl. It makes no sense."

=== Public ===
- 1969: Gallup conducted its first poll on legalizing cannabis, finding 12% in favor.
- 1973: General Social Survey's first poll on legalizing cannabis showed 19% in favor.
- 1977: Gallup reported 28% support for the legalization of cannabis, a number that would not be surpassed until 2000.
- 2011: Gallup reported 50% support for legalizing cannabis.
- 2013: Pew Research reported 52% and Gallup 58% in support of legalizing cannabis. In both polls, a majority of respondents supported legalization for the first time.
- 2017: Gallup's annual poll showed 64% support for the legalization of cannabis, including a majority of Republicans for the first time.
- 2018: Reflecting the increased growth of support for marijuana legalization, Gallup's annual poll showed that 66% of Americans supported legalization, including 78% of people aged 18 to 34, 75% of Democrats, 71% of Independents, 65% of people aged 35 to 54, 59% of people over 55, 53% of Republicans, and at least 65% support in the East, South, Midwest, and West.
- 2023: A Gallup poll indicates that 70% of adults in the United States support the legalization of cannabis.

== See also ==
- Legalization of non-medical cannabis in the United States
- Legality of cannabis in the United States, by jurisdiction
- Medical cannabis in the United States
- Timeline of cannabis law
