= Initiative 71 =

Initiative 71 may refer to:

- 2004 California Proposition 71, a California voter initiative to support stem cell research
- 2014 Washington, D.C., Initiative 71, a Washington, D.C., voter initiative to legalize recreational cannabis
