= DC Board of Ethics and Government Accountability =

Independent ethics and transparency agency of the District of Columbia government

Board of Ethics and Government Accountability
Agency overview
- Formed: 2012
- Jurisdiction: Government of the District of Columbia
- Headquarters: Washington, D.C., United States
- Employees: 25
- Agency executive: Norma Hutcheson, Chair
- Parent agency: Independent agency
- Website: bega.dc.gov

The Board of Ethics and Government Accountability (BEGA) is an independent agency of the Government of the District of Columbia responsible for administering and enforcing the District's ethics laws and open government requirements.

== History and structure ==
Several ethics related controversies and federal indictments of D.C. government officials led to legislation to strengthen and centralize ethics enforcement in the D.C. government. Prior to its establishment, ethics oversight functions were handled by the District of Columbia Board of Elections and Ethics (BOEE). In 2012 the Council of the District of Columbia passed legislation that removed ethics from the District of Columbia Board of Elections and consolidated these responsibilities within a single independent body with authority to investigate alleged violations and issue advisory guidance. BEGA was established by the Council of the District of Columbia through the Board of Ethics and Government Accountability Establishment and Comprehensive Ethics Reform Amendment Act of 2011, which took effect on April 27, 2012. BEGA's first chairperson was Robert Spagnoletti, former Attorney General for the District of Columbia.

Statutory amendments refined BEGA's structure and clarified the responsibilities of its component offices, including the D.C. Office of Government Ethics and the D.C. Office of Open Government. The D.C. Office of Open Government was initially an independent office, but in 2018 was made subject to BEGA after controversial enforcement actions by the first director of the Office of Open Government. BEGA consists of a governing board and two principal operational offices, the Office of Government Ethics and the Office of Open Government.

=== Office of Government Ethics ===
The Office of Government Ethics investigates alleged violations of the District's Code of Conduct by public officials and employees and may bring enforcement actions before the Board. The D.C. Office of Government Ethics also provides ethics training, advisory opinions, and guidance on matters such as conflicts of interest, gifts, outside employment, and misuse of government resources. The Director of Government Ethics who leads the D.C. Office of Government Ethics is Ashley Cooks.

=== Office of Open Government ===
The Office of Open Government ensures compliance with the D.C. Open Meetings Act and provides advice and training to public bodies regarding transparency requirements of the D.C. Open Meetings Act. The D.C. Office of Open Government also trains and advises on the D.C. Freedom of Information Act. The office may issue advisory opinions interpreting open government laws and works to ensure that meetings of covered public bodies are conducted openly and with proper notice and the office may bring a lawsuit in the Superior Court of the District of Columbia to enforce the D.C. Open Meetings Act. The D.C. Office of Open Government's Director of Open Government is Niquelle Allen.

== Public role and oversight ==
BEGA serves as the District government's primary ethics enforcement body and has periodically been involved in investigations and administrative proceedings concerning public officials and employees. Ethics enforcement activity that concerns government officials, especially members of the Council of the District of Columbia, are of great public interest and the source of media coverage in Washington, DC. BEGA's 2025 investigation of D.C. Councilmember Trayon White for alleged violations of the District's Code of Conduct and financial disclosure requirements received public attention. The proceedings before BEGA's Board related to White's disclosure compliance and ethics allegations was also discussed in relation to a criminal trial. BEGA has also been involved in investigations concerning the Mayor of the District of Columbia's travels. BEGA's earlier ethics investigations surrounded former DC Councilmember Jack Evans and illustrated the agency's role within the District government as an ethics enforcer.

BEGA organizational structure has also been a source of disagreement in the District government and the agency's work and authority was the subject of reform efforts in 2018 and 2020. In June 2018, following the controversy regarding the departure of former director Traci Hughes, BEGA selected Niquelle Allen to lead the Office of Open Government. Hughes' exit followed disputes involving transparency-law investigations and allegations of political pressure related to open-meetings enforcement and Allen's appointment was described as part of BEGA's effort to move past the controversy.

BEGA's Office of Open Government actively weighs in on issues related to government transparency and open meetings in DC. The Office of Open Government has weighed in on the controversial D.C. Council amendments to the District's open meetings laws that would allow private meetings with the Mayor of the District of Columbia, illustrating the agency's advisory role on transparency policy. Legislative changes to the District's Open Meetings Act drew public debate over amendments affecting closed-meeting authority of the D.C. Council where its members justified the changes because they wanted more flexibility to have private discussions with colleagues; the majority of D.C. Council ultimately voted to allow secret meetings on an emergency basis and the law became immediately effective. Transparency advocates, including the Office of Open Government, criticized the legislation as eroding the public trust and Allen mentioned the open meetings law already provides for closed meetings when necessary so the change was not needed. The Office of Open Government also evaluated whether an agency's shutdown of meetings of the Science Advisory Board, as it related to the Board's review of the District's crime lab, violated the Open Meetings Act. The Office of Open Government has also spoken publicly about how state and local public-records laws are modeled on the federal Freedom of Information Act, including Allen's commentary cited in national transparency discussions regarding the release of COVID-19-era government emails. The Office of Open Government's previous work on government transparency concerned criticism of D.C. government for failing to make architectural and building plans available online and placing an undue burden on the public because D.C. government did not meet its records transparency and FOIA/record-keeping obligations.

== See also ==
- Government of the District of Columbia
- District of Columbia Open Meetings Act
- District of Columbia Freedom of Information Act
- Freedom of Information Act (United States)
- District of Columbia Board of Elections
- Jack Evans (Washington, D.C., politician)
- Trayon White
