= Founding Farmers =

Upscale restaurant owned by North Dakota Farmers Union and Farmers Restaurant Group

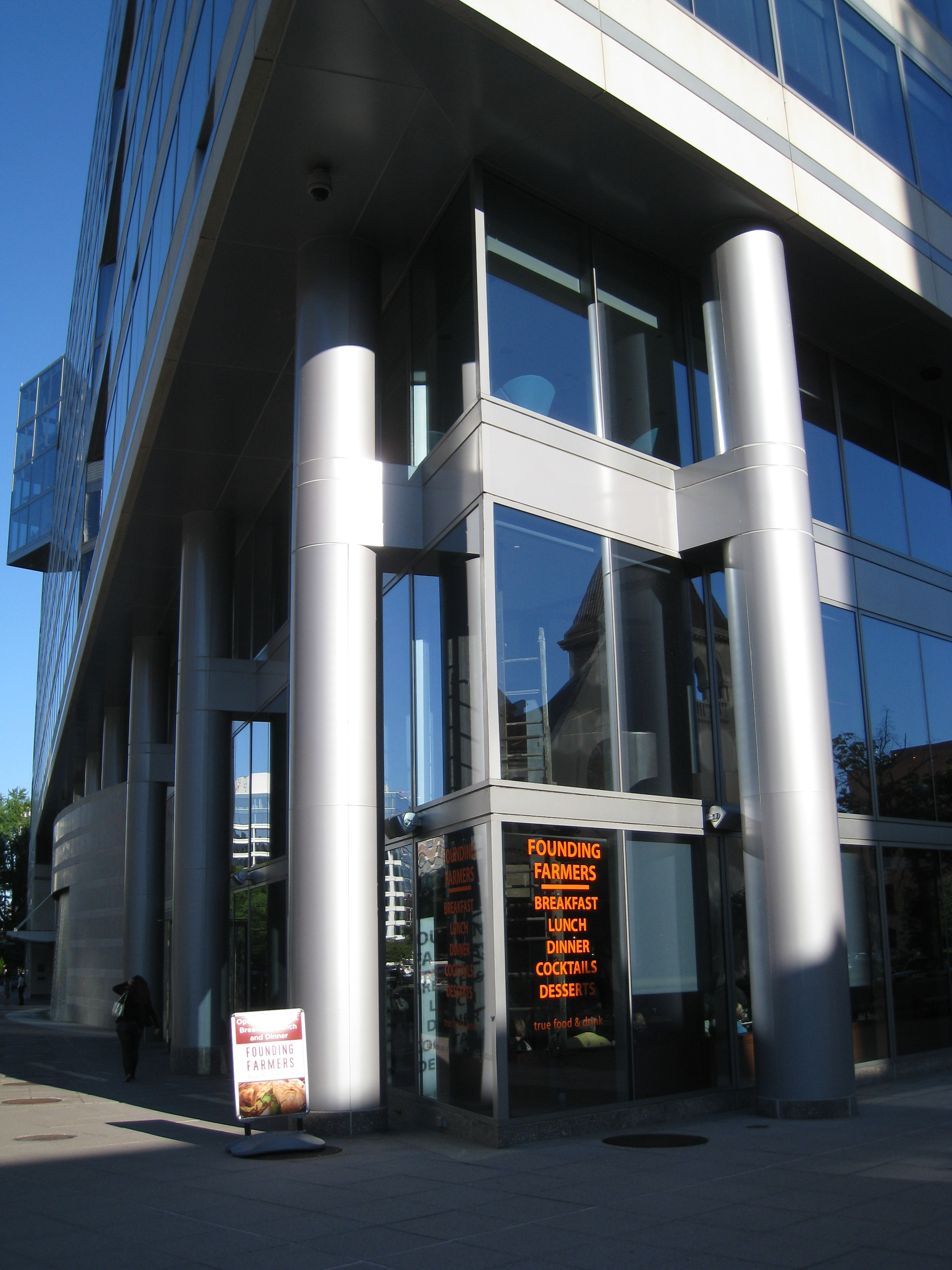
- Founding Farmers' original location in Foggy Bottom, Washington, D.C.
- Type: Private
- Industry: Restaurants
- Founded: Washington, D.C, restaurant (2008)
- Founders: Michael Vucurevich & Dan Simons
- Headquarters: Potomac, MD
- Number of locations: 8 restaurants
- Key people: Michael Vucurevich & Dan Simons, Co-Owners; Mark Watne, Owner, Investor; Joe Goetze, Head Chef
- Number of employees: 1,200
- Website: wearefoundingfarmers.com

Founding Farmers is an American upscale casual restaurant owned by North Dakota Farmers Union (NDFU) and Farmers Restaurant Group (FRG). The restaurant was founded in 2008 when Farmers Restaurant Group coowners Dan Simons and Michael Vucurevich partnered with North Dakota Farmers Union to open the flagship Founding Farmers on Pennsylvania Avenue in Washington, D.C.

== History ==
In 2005, members of North Dakota Farmers Union (NDFU) were interested in developing a restaurant where guests could have access to, and benefit from, food grown, raised, and harvested on American family farms. They also wanted to bring awareness to American family farmers and help farmers earn a larger share of the food dollar. NDFU first started a restaurant called Agraria, which failed due to numerous factors. NDFU partnered with restaurant consultants Dan Simons and Michael Vucurevich to open the first of their restaurants, Founding Farmers DC, in 2008. In 2013, Founding Farmers published a cookbook with 100 of their menu items.

Founding Farmers restaurants were sued in 2017 for overtime and wage violations. The lawsuit alleged they had employees work at different restaurants to get around having to pay overtime wages, had to share tips with managers, denied sick leave, and required employees to attend meetings without being paid. Founding Farmers denied the accusation but agreed to pay up to $1.49 million to settle the lawsuit. Since opening Founding Farmers DC in 2008, FRG has opened 7 other locations in DC, Maryland, Virginia, and Pennsylvania.

== Reviews ==
Travel and Leisure Magazine named Founding Farmers "The Best Farm-To-Table" in Washington, D.C. In 2015, Founding Farmers gained recognition in the New York Times for their inclusive gender-neutral restrooms. In early 2011, Chef Robert Irvine discussed Founding Farmers' Devilish-Eggs on Food Network's "The Best Thing I Ever Ate". In June 2016, popular food critic Tom Sietsema reviewed Founding Farmers in The Washington Post, giving the restaurant a 0-star rating. Founding Farmers sets the DC Record for Number of Yelp Reviews
