= District of Columbia Home Rule Act =

1973 United States law devolving powers to a D.C. local government

District of Columbia Self-Government and Governmental Reorganization Act
- Other short titles: District of Columbia Home Rule Act
- Long title: To reorganize the governmental structure of the District of Columbia, to provide a charter for local government in the District of Columbia subject to acceptance by a majority of the registered qualified electors in the District of Columbia, to delegate certain legislative powers to the local government, to implement certain recommendations of the Commission on the Organization of the Government of the District of Columbia, and for other purposes.
- Enacted by: the 93rd United States Congress

Citations
- Public law: Pub. L. 93–198
- Statutes at Large: 87 Stat. 774

Legislative history
- Introduced in the Senate as S.1435 by Thomas Eagleton (D–MO) on April 2, 1973; Committee consideration by Senate Committee on the District of Columbia; Passed the Senate on July 10, 1973 (69-17); Passed the House on October 10, 1973 (Voice vote); Reported by the joint conference committee on December 6, 1973; agreed to by the House on December 17, 1973 (272-74) and by the Senate on December 19, 1973 (77-13); Signed into law by President Richard Nixon on December 24, 1973

The District of Columbia Home Rule Act is a United States federal law passed on December 24, 1973, which devolved certain congressional powers of the District of Columbia to local government, furthering District of Columbia home rule. In particular, it includes the District Charter (also called the Home Rule Charter), which provides for an elected mayor and the Council of the District of Columbia. The council is composed of a chair elected at large and twelve members, four of whom are elected at large, and one from each of the District's eight wards. Council members are elected to four-year terms.

Under the "Home Rule" government, Congress reviews all legislation passed by the council before it can become law and retains authority over the District's budget. Also, the President appoints the District's judges, and the District still has no voting representation in Congress. Because of these and other limitations on local government, many citizens of the District continue to lobby for greater autonomy, such as complete statehood.

The Home Rule Act specifically prohibits the council from enacting certain laws that, among other restrictions, would:

- lend public credit for private projects;
- impose a tax on individuals who work in the District but live elsewhere;
- make any changes to the Height of Buildings Act of 1910;
- pass any law changing the composition or jurisdiction of the local courts;
- enact a local budget that is not balanced; and
- gain any additional authority over the National Capital Planning Commission, Washington Aqueduct, or District of Columbia National Guard.

== Laws blocked by Congress ==
Article One, Section 8 of the United States Constitution gives Congress legislative authority over the capital federal district. The Home Rule Act gives the District of Columbia's local government broad authority over its own policies, but Congress still has the ultimate power and can block local legislation.

Broadly, Congress has two ways to exercise that authority. Most commonly, it includes provisions in other legislation, like appropriations bills, to dictate policies to block funding for them. The Home Rule Act also provides for an expedited disapproval procedure to block D.C. laws without the potential for a Senate filibuster.

Since the Home Rule Act's enactment, Congress has exercised this power several times.

- In 1988, Congress voted to block D.C. from expending local funds to cover abortion services through Medicaid. This was repealed in 2009 but then reinstated in 2011.
- Passed by the D.C. Council in 1992, the Health Care Benefits Expansion Act allowed both gay and straight couples to register as domestic partners, allowing familial recognition for such things as hospital visits and allowing the partners of D.C. government employees to purchase private health insurance, was blocked by Congress. The act was finally allowed to go into effect in 2001.
- In 1996, the D.C. Council passed a clean needle exchange program law. However, in 1998, Congress voted to block the law. In 2007, Congress voted to lift the ban, thus allowing the law to go into effect.
- In 1998, Congress voted to block Initiative 59 – Legalization of Marijuana for Medical Treatment Initiative of 1998 – via the Barr amendment. This also caused the result of the referendum to be withheld. When this was challenged in court, it was determined that withholding the result of the referendum violated the First Amendment. In response to this, another amendment was passed in 2000 that simply overturned Initiative 59. In 2009, Congress voted to overturn the ban on Initiative 59, allowing D.C.'s medical marijuana law to go into effect, with the first medical marijuana sale occurring in 2013.
- In 2014, Congress voted to block Initiative 71 – Legalization of Possession of Minimal Amounts of Marijuana for Personal Use Act of 2014 – by blocking funds from being used to enact laws, rules or regulations for reducing or legalizing any Schedule I drug. However, since this was passed after the results of Initiative 71 had already been announced, it did not prevent the legalization of marijuana, but had the effect of leaving marijuana legal, but without the authority to expend funds on enacting regulations or taxation.

Congress has successfully used the disapproval process in the Home Rule Act five times:

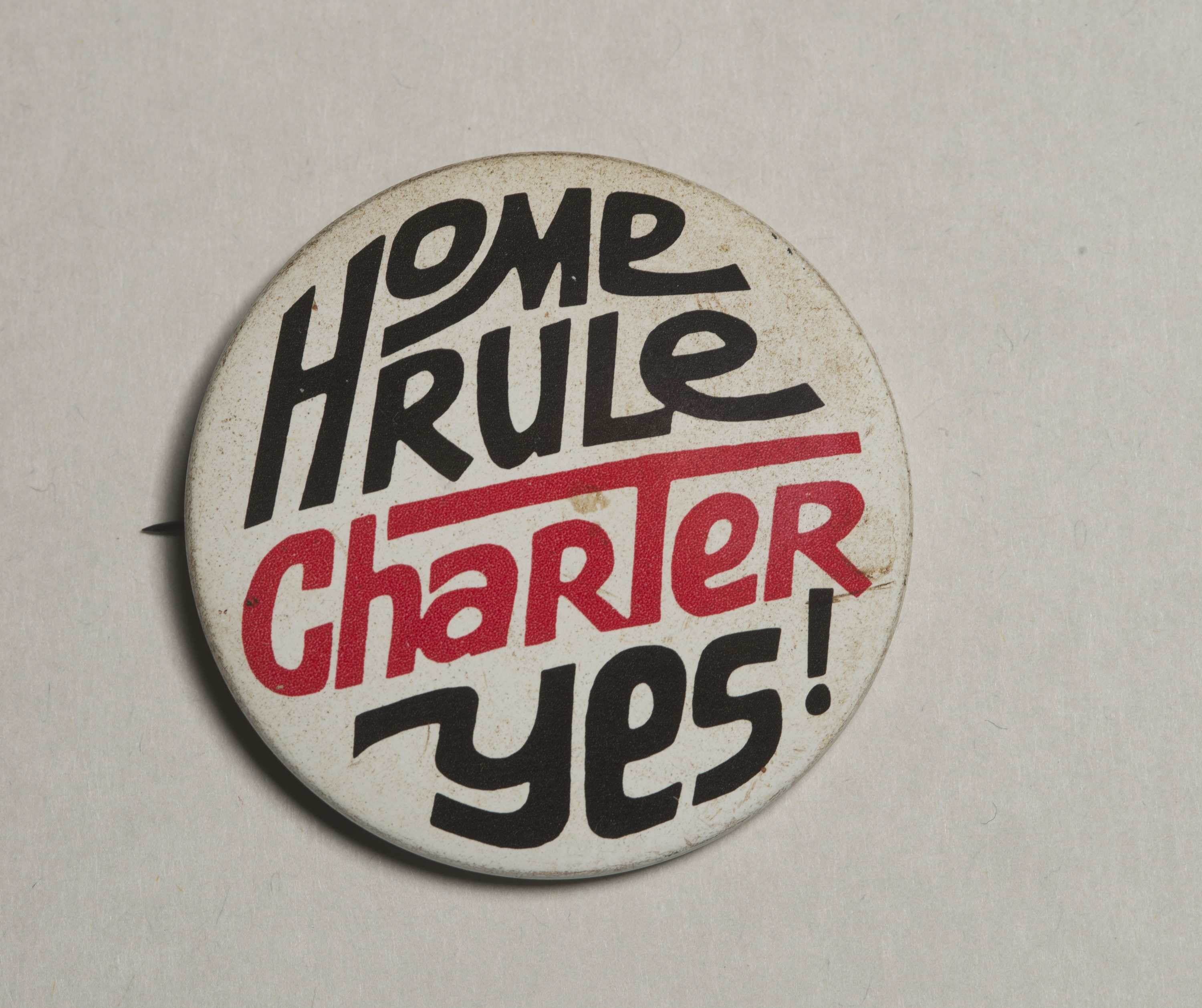
Pin-back badge in support of the Home Rule Charter, 1974

- In 1979, lawmakers blocked the Location of Chanceries Amendment Act of 1979. The law sought to restrict where foreign embassies could build chanceries within the city.
- In 1981, Congress overturned the Sexual Assault Reform Act of 1981. The act would have overhauled the city's sexual assault laws, including by legalizing homosexual acts and sodomy and allowing married women to press charges of rape against their husbands. Advocacy for congressional action was led by conservative Christian activists, including Moral Majority.
- In 1990, Congress blocked the Schedule of Heights Amendment Act of 1990. That law would have granted an exemption to the city's building height restrictions for a development in the Penn Quarter neighborhood.
- In 2023, Congress voted in favor of H.J.Res.26 to block the Revised Criminal Code Act of 2022. DC's Revised Criminal Code Act of 2022 would have re-worked criminal justice policies in the District of Columbia. It would have also eliminated mandatory minimum sentences for many crimes. It would have also reduced the maximum penalties for many crimes like burglary, carjacking, and robbery.
- In 2026, President Donald Trump signed H.J.Res.142, which blocked The D.C. Income and Franchise Tax Conformity and Revision Temporary Amendment Act of 2025.

== 2025 repeal proposal ==
In February 2025, two Republicans in Congress, Representative Andy Ogles and Senator Mike Lee, Republican of Utah, introduced a bill to repeal the Home Rule Act. The "Bringing Oversight to Washington and Safety to Every Resident Act", colloquially known as the "BOWSER Act" after Mayor of Washington Muriel Bowser, was intended to reverse the provisions of the Home Rule Act, including the abolition of both the position of Mayor and the council, although the legislation as written indicated no replacement for the existing governmental structures in place to serve local government in the District. A similar bill introduced in the Senate in 2024 during the previous Congressional term had stalled during initial deliberations in committee.

== Emergency takeover of police ==
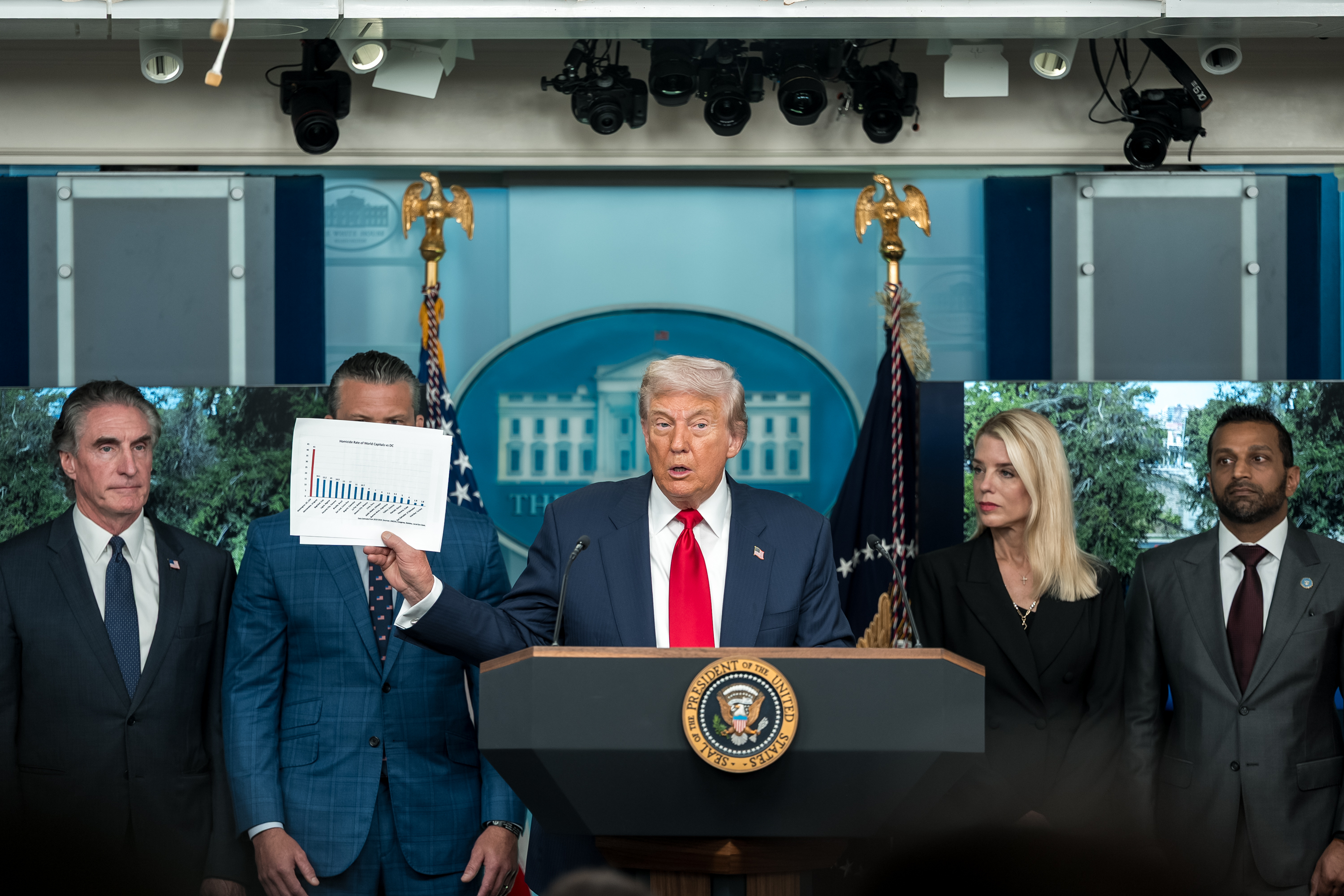
President Donald Trump and FBI Director Kash Patel (far right) in a press conference on crime in Washington, D.C. in August 2025

Section 740 of the DC Home Rule Act, entitled "Emergency Control of Police" requires the mayor of DC to "provide, such services of the Metropolitan Police force as the President may deem necessary and appropriate" whenever the President of the United States determines that "special conditions of an emergency nature exist which require the use of the Metropolitan Police force for Federal purposes". (The Metropolitan Police Department of the District of Columbia or MPD is normally under control of the city government.) The President is required to notify the leaders of the Committee on the District of Columbia of the Senate and the House of Representatives in writing within 48 hours. The law requires Congress to approve the action within 30 days if it is in session, or after coming into session.

The first and so far only invocation of this section was by President Donald Trump on August 11, 2025, in the executive order "Declaring a Crime Emergency in the District of Columbia".
