= 2014 Washington, D.C., Initiative 71 =

Ballot measure legalizing cannabis in Washington, D.C.

Initiative 71
- An initiative to legalize the possession and cultivation of cannabis for personal use in small amounts.

Results
| Choice | Votes | % |
|---|---|---|
| Yes | 115,050 | 70.06% |
| No | 49,168 | 29.94% |
| Valid votes | 164,218 | 100.00% |
| Invalid or blank votes | 0 | 0.00% |
| Total votes | 164,218 | 100.00% |
Precinct results
Yes
80–90%
70–80%
60–70%
50–60%
No
50–60%
Other
No votes

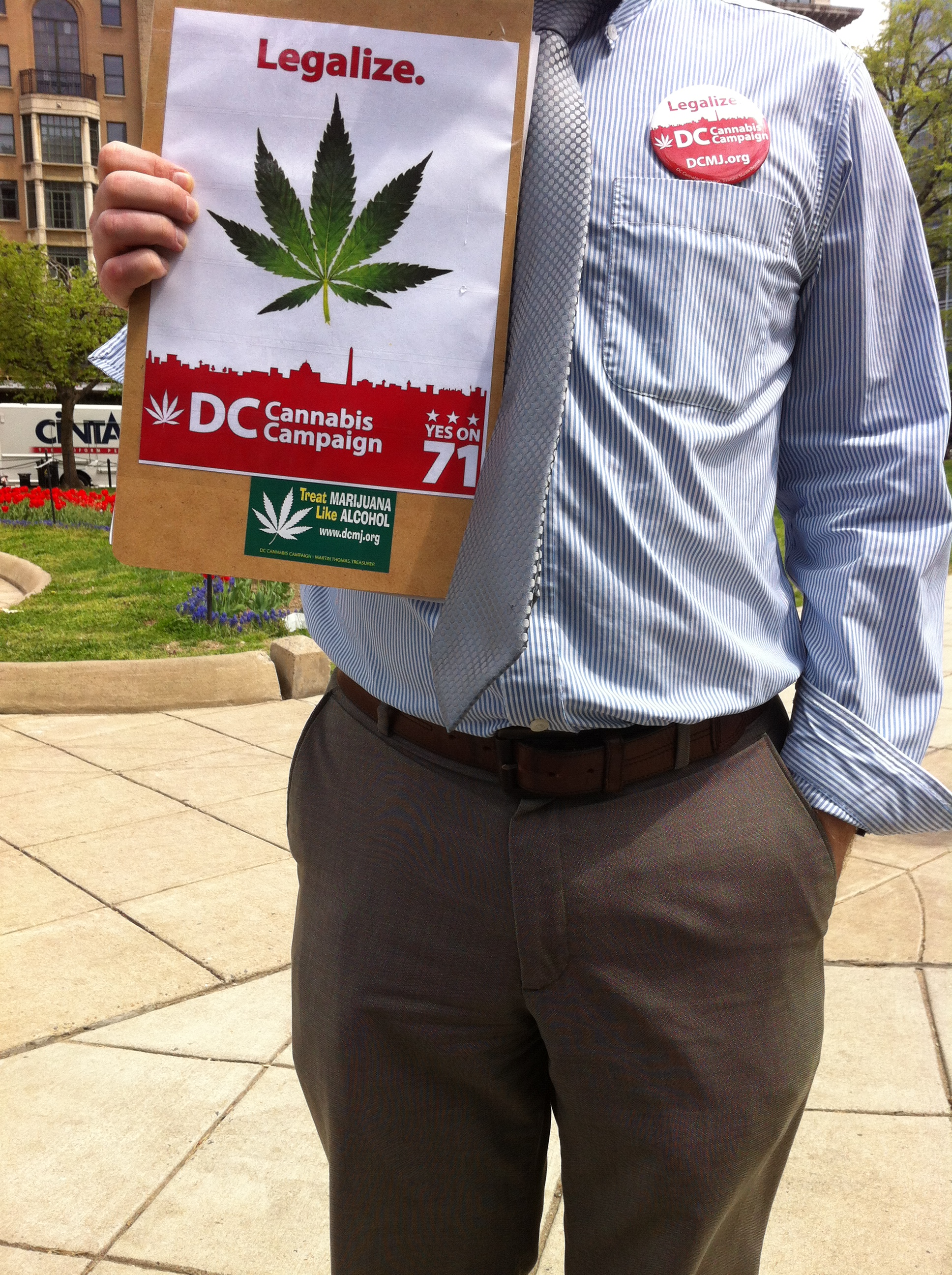
A canvasser for the DC Cannabis Campaign soliciting signatures for Initiative 71

Initiative 71 was a voter-approved ballot measure in Washington, D.C., that legalized the recreational use of cannabis. The short title of the initiative was "Legalization of Possession of Minimal Amounts of Marijuana for Personal Use Act of 2014". The measure was approved by 64.87% of voters on November 4, 2014 and went into full effect on February 26, 2015.

Due to a congressional mandate, Washington, D.C., is not permitted to establish recreational marijuana dispensaries as outlined in Initiative 71. As such, marijuana is currently legal to possess and use in the District and to gift up to one ounce but not to commercially produce or sell. However, the legalization of gifting up to one ounce of cannabis as outlined in Initiative 71, has created a gift economy, where stores and businesses in D.C. exchange cannabis as a gift with the purchases of items such as t-shirts, stickers etc, which are actually being purchased by customers.

== Creation ==
In 2010, DC-based headshop Capitol Hemp was one of the largest contributors to the failed Proposition 19, which would have legalized cannabis in California. The following year in 2011, Capitol Hemp was raided by the Washington, DC Metropolitan Police Department for allegedly selling paraphernalia. As required in a deferred prosecution agreement with U.S. Attorneys, owners Adam Eidinger and Alan Amsterdam were forced to shut down the stores in September 2012 and decided to start the process to change the law.

In early 2013, local activists Adam Eidinger, Nikolas Schiller, and Alan Amsterdam formed a skeleton organization "DCMJ" to advocate decriminalization of marijuana in the District. After seeing no movement from the Council of the District of Columbia, Eidinger submitted initial paperwork for a decriminalization ballot initiative, which was rejected by the Board of Election in September 2013 on technical budgetary grounds. The following month DCMJ solicited online feedback and resubmitted a second version, now strengthened to call for full legalization of marijuana. In an interview with the Washington Post, Eidinger attributed his inspiration to legalize marijuana to his experiences in the 2011 police raids on his Capitol Hemp retail store, which was forced into closure by the city.

On January 10, 2014, the DC Cannabis Campaign submitted the final version of the ballot initiative to the District of Columbia Board of Elections. Hearings were held in February and March, and on April 4, 2014, the board finalized the ballot initiative language.

== Petition gathering ==
The campaign collected petition signatures from April 23 until the July 7 deadline, ultimately submitting over 55,000 signatures; the District certified 27,688 of the signatures as valid, exceeding the 22,600 requirement.

== Intervening decriminalization ==
While the campaign was preparing its ballot initiative, on March 4, 2014, the Council of the District of Columbia decriminalized possession of cannabis, which went into effect in July following the mandatory 30-day congressional review period. Medical cannabis had already been legalized in the District by Initiative 59 in 1998, but its implementation was blocked by Congress until 2009, with the first legal sales occurring in 2013.

== Election ==
Throughout 2014, the DC Cannabis Campaign advocated for passage of the measure, while groups such as Two Is Enough D.C. formed to oppose the measure.

The measure was approved by 64.87% of voters on November 4, 2014. Almost immediately following, Republicans in Congress, and Maryland Representative Andy Harris in particular, vowed to block legalization of cannabis in D.C. The ballot results were certified on December 3, 2014.

Initiative 71
| Choice | Votes | % |
|---|---|---|
| For | 115,050 | 70.06 |
| Against | 49,168 | 29.94 |
| Total | 164,218 | 100.00 |
| Registered voters/turnout | 177,358 | – |

Source: DC Board of Elections

== Opposition in Congress ==
In mid-December 2014, Congress passed an omnibus spending bill (nicknamed the "CRomnibus"—a portmanteau of omnibus and continuing resolution) that ended the federal ban on medical marijuana, but that also included a legislative rider targeted at D.C.'s Initiative 71. The rider's final language barred the use of funds to "enact any law, rule, or regulation to legalize or otherwise reduce penalties associated with the possession, use, or distribution of any schedule I substance under the Controlled Substances Act (21 U.S.C. 801 et seq.) or any tetrahydrocannabinols derivative for recreational purposes." The final language notably solely used the phrase "enact" rather than "enact or carry out." Delegate Eleanor Holmes Norton said that "she was told by Democratic budget negotiators that the omission was made on purpose to give city leaders a chance to argue that in moving forward, the District is only carrying out, and not enacting, the measure." Norton reiterated this point in an Initiative 71 questions and answers section on her House Web site.

Both Mayor Muriel Bowser and the Council of the District of Columbia took the position that the voter-approved initiative became self-enacting. On January 13, 2015, D.C. Council Chairman Phil Mendelson sent the measure to Congress for a mandatory 30-day review period, in accordance with the District of Columbia Home Rule Act.

On February 24, 2015, Representatives Jason Chaffetz and Mark Meadows sent a letter to Bowser urging her to not move forward with Initiative 71. Congressional Republicans, including the omnibus rider author's Andy Harris, threatened prison time for the D.C. mayor and others involved, suggesting that they could be prosecuted by the Justice Department under the Anti-Deficiency Act, which "imposes criminal penalties on government employees who knowingly spend public funds in excess of their appropriated budgets."

== Completion ==
This congressional review period ended at 12:01 a.m. on February 26, 2015, making D.C. then the "only place east of the Mississippi River where people can legally grow and share marijuana in private." D.C. "allows adults 21 and older to possess up to two ounces of marijuana, grow up to six plants, and gift up to one ounce of pot to other adults 21 and older, but sales remain banned", as Washington, D.C.'s ballot initiative process does not allow spending mandates such as commercialization would require. However the legalization of gifting up to one ounce of cannabis as outlined in Initiative 71 has created a gifting economy in DC, where stores and businesses in DC exchange cannabis as a gift with the purchases of items such as t-shirts, stickers etc, which are actually being purchased by customers.

== See also ==
- Cannabis in the District of Columbia
- Decriminalization of non-medical cannabis in the United States#State recreational legalization begins (2012)
- Legal history of cannabis in the United States#State-level legalization
- Timeline of cannabis legalization in the United States#Municipal
