= 1998 Washington, D.C., Initiative 59 =

Ballot measure in Washington, D.C., legalizing medical cannabis

Initiative 59
- "Legalization of Marijuana for Medical Treatment Initiative of 1998.

Results
Choice	Votes	%
Yes	75,536	68.57%
No	34,621	31.43%
Total votes	110,157	100.00%
Ward results
Yes
70–80%
60–70%

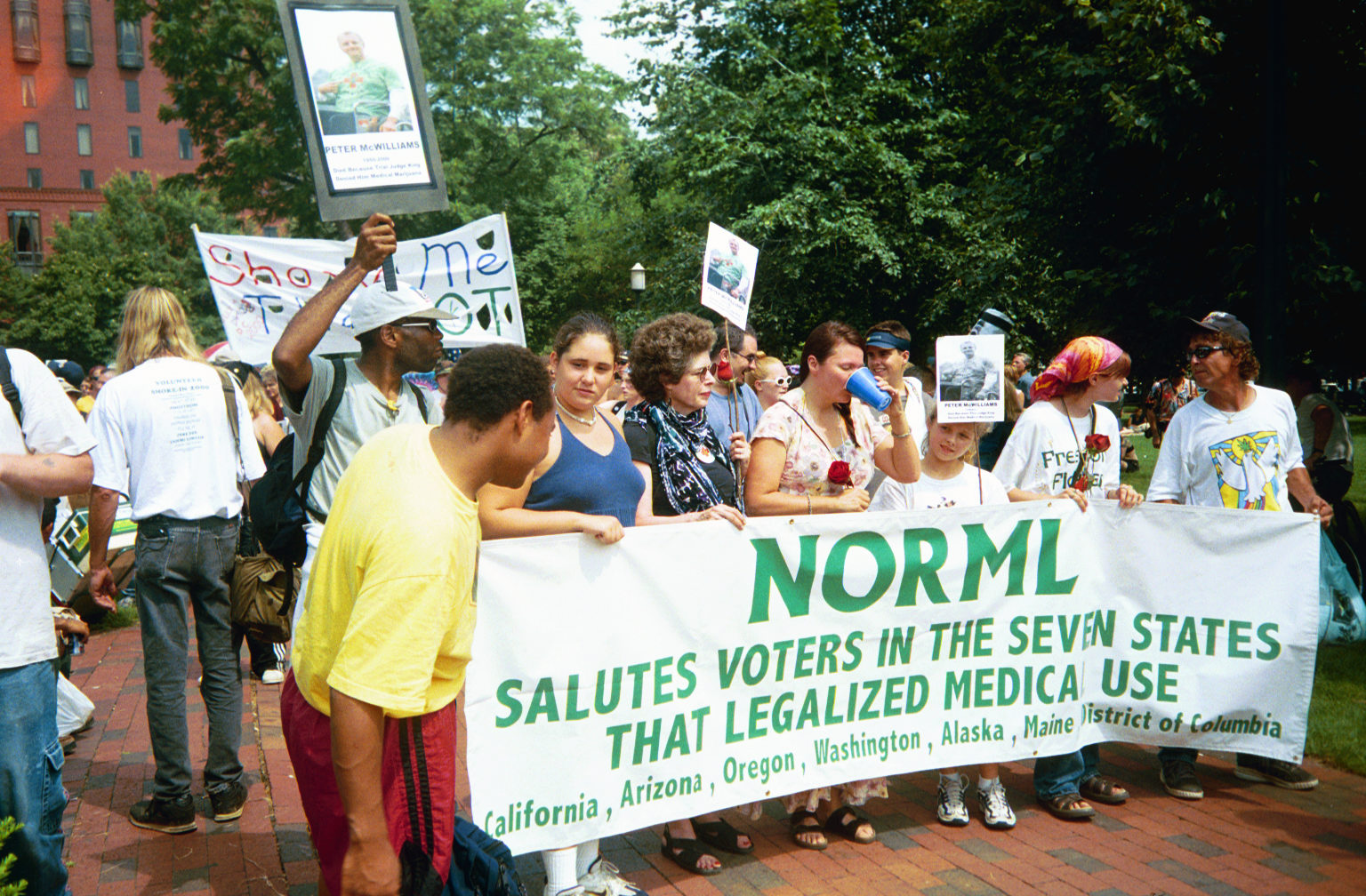
NORML members protest in Lafayette Park across from the White House during the annual July 4th "Smoke-In" in 2000.

Initiative 59 was a voter-approved ballot initiative in Washington, D.C., that sought to legalize medical cannabis. The short title of the initiative was "Legalization of Marijuana for Medical Treatment Initiative of 1998". Though the initiative passed with 69% of the vote in November 1998, its implementation was delayed by Congress's passage of the Barr Amendment, which prohibited DC from using its funds in support of the program. This Amendment delayed the start of the medical marijuana program until it was effectively overturned in 2009, with the first DC customer legally purchasing medical cannabis at a dispensary in the District in 2013.

== Barr Amendment ==
In 1998, Georgia Congressman Bob Barr successfully blocked implementation of Initiative 59 – the "Legalization of Marijuana for Medical Treatment Initiative of 1998" – which would have legalized medical marijuana in Washington, D.C. The "Barr Amendment" to the 1999 Omnibus spending bill not only blocked implementation of Initiative 59, but also prohibited the vote tally from even being released. Nearly a year passed before a lawsuit filed by the American Civil Liberties Union eventually revealed the initiative had received 69% of the vote. In response to the judge's ruling, Barr attached another "Barr Amendment" to the 2000 Omnibus spending bill that overturned Initiative 59 outright. The Barr Amendment also prohibited future laws that would "decrease the penalties for marijuana or other Schedule I drugs" in Washington, D.C. This preemptively blocked future attempts by Marijuana Policy Project (MPP) to reform marijuana laws in DC via the initiative process. In March 2002, U.S. District Judge Emmet Sullivan struck down this portion of the Barr Amendment as being an unconstitutional restriction on free speech. Barr criticized the ruling, arguing the court had ignored Congress' constitutional right to pass laws protecting citizens from "dangerous and addictive narcotics."

The federal government later prevailed on appeal, reinstating the Barr Amendment just in time to thwart MPP's initiative 63 – "The Medical Marijuana Initiative of 2002" – which had already qualified for the November 2002 ballot. In 2009, both the United States Senate and House of Representatives voted to lift the ban against a medical marijuana initiative, effectively overturning the Barr Amendment.

== Initiative 71 and legalization of recreational cannabis ==
In 2014, the legalization of non-commercial possession and cultivation of recreational marijuana was approved by District of Columbia voters through Initiative 71.

== See also ==
- Cannabis in the United States#District of Columbia
- Decriminalization of non-medical cannabis in the United States#Second wave of decriminalization begins (2001)
- Timeline of cannabis legalization in the United States#Municipal
- Legal history of cannabis in the United States#State-level legalization
- Initiatives and referendums in the District of Columbia
