= District of Columbia Board of Elections =

Independent agency administering elections in Washington, D.C.

Agency overview
- Formed: 1955
- Jurisdiction: Government of the District of Columbia
- Headquarters: Washington, D.C., United States
- Agency executive: Gary Thompson, Chair
- Parent agency: Independent agency
- Website: www.dcboe.org

The District of Columbia Board of Elections (BOE) is the independent agency of the District government responsible for the administration of elections, ballot access and voter registration. The BOE consists of three active board members, an executive director, a general counsel and a number of support staff who run the day-to-day operations of the agency.

Within the BOE is the Office of Campaign Finance which enforces DC laws related to campaign finance, lobbying and conduct of public officials.

The agency was formed by an act of Congress in 1955. In 1974, Congress passed the District of Columbia Campaign Finance Reform and Conflict of Interest Act, renaming the body as the District of Columbia Board of Elections & Ethics (BOEE). In 2012, the ethics board was separated. The district's 2012 ethics law established a new DC Board of Ethics and Government Accountability that would handle the ethical matters that were formerly handled by the Board of Elections & Ethics.

== Ranked-choice voting ==
In 2024, District voters approved Initiative 83, establishing ranked-choice voting for certain elections. The Board was tasked with implementing the system for subsequent elections. Debate occurred over whether implementation should be delayed, but officials proceeded with preparations for the 2026 primary.

== Congressional oversight and election law disputes ==
Under the District of Columbia Home Rule Act, Congress retains authority to review District legislation. In 2025, the U.S. House of Representatives voted to overturn a D.C. law allowing certain non-citizen residents to vote in local elections.

The policy drew national attention and criticism, and reporting documented harassment directed at District election officials during the controversy.

== Litigation ==
The Board has been involved in litigation concerning voter-roll maintenance and data transparency. In 2024, a lawsuit challenging aspects of the District’s voter registration practices was dismissed following a settlement requiring certain disclosures with redactions. The U.S. Justice Department sued three states and the District of Columbia in 2025 for not turning over requested voter information to the Civil Rights Division of the U.S. Justice Department.

== Data security ==
In 2023, the Board reported a breach involving a third-party hosting provider that exposed voter registration data. The agency stated that it coordinated with federal cybersecurity officials and law enforcement in response.

== See also ==
- Elections in the United States
- Government of the District of Columbia
- DC Board of Ethics and Government Accountability
