= Tipped wage =

Distinct minimum wage for employees earning substantial tips

The tipped wage is the base wage paid to an employee in the United States who receives a substantial portion of their compensation from tips. According to a common labor law provision referred to as a "tip credit", the employee must earn at least the state's minimum wage when tips and wages are combined, or the employer is required to increase the wage to fulfill that threshold. This ensures that all tipped employees earn at least the minimum wage: significantly more than the tipped minimum wage.

== Tipped minimum wage law in the United States ==
=== Federal law ===
The United States federal government requires a wage of at least $2.13 per hour be paid to employees who receive at least $30 per month in tips. If wages and tips do not equal the federal minimum wage of $7.25 per hour during any week, the employer is required to increase cash wages to compensate.

=== State law ===
Though the vast majority of employers are bound to the federal minimum wage, some states have chosen to increase the tipped minimum wage above the federal requirement. Seven states (and the territory of Guam) apply the same minimum wage to tipped and non-tipped employees. The other 43 states – including those without state minimum wage laws – have a lower minimum wage for tipped employees than for traditional employees, and require employers to make up for any wages that fall below the minimum wage.

The District of Columbia, which has the highest-paid waiters and waitresses in the country (mean wage: $24.42/hour), has a minimum wage of $8.00 for tipped employees. In the state of Alaska, California, Minnesota, Montana, Nevada, Oregon, Washington, same minimum wage are applied for both tipped and non-tipped employees. Tips collected by employees in these states will not offset employer's obligation to pay the wage, and tips is the additional income beyond the wage paid by employer. The District of Columbia will be eliminating the tipped wage by 2027.

Minimum tipped wage by U.S. state, District of Columbia (D.C.), and U.S. territories
State, D.C., territory	Wage	Notes
Alabama	$2.13	
Alaska	$13.00	Same for tipped and non-tipped employees.
Arizona	$12.15	Tipped wage plus tips must reach $15.15/h.
Arkansas	$2.63	Tipped wage plus tips must reach $11.00/h.
California	$16.90	Same for tipped and non-tipped employees.
Colorado	$11.40	Tipped wage plus tips must reach $14.42/h.
Connecticut	$16.94	Bartenders’ minimum wage is $8.23/h, Hotel/Restaurant minimum wage is $6.38/h, tipped wage plus tips must reach $16.94/h.
Delaware	$2.23	Tipped wage plus tips must reach $13.25/h.
District of Columbia	$10.00	Tipped wage plus tips must reach $17.50/h. By 2027, the tipped wage will be eliminated.
Florida	$8.98	Tipped wage plus tips must reach $12.00/h.
Georgia	$2.13	
Hawaii	$12.75	Tipped wage plus tips must reach $14.00/h.
Idaho	$3.35	
Illinois	$9.00	Tipped wage plus tips must reach $15.00/h.
Indiana	$2.13	
Iowa	$4.35	
Kansas	$2.13	
Kentucky	$2.13	
Louisiana	$2.13	
Maine	$7.08	Tipped wage plus tips must reach $14.15/h.
Massachusetts	$6.75	Tipped wage plus tips must reach $15.00/h.
Maryland	$3.63	Tipped wage plus tips must reach $15.00/h.
Michigan	$5.99	Tipped wage plus tips must reach $12.48/h.
Minnesota	$14.41	
Mississippi	$2.13	
Missouri	$6.15	Tipped wage plus tips must reach $12.30/h.
Montana	$11.85	Same for tipped and non-tipped employees. Lower wage for employers not covered by FLSA and earning less than $110,000 in gross sales.
Nebraska	$2.13	Tipped wage plus tips must reach $12.00/h.
Nevada	$12.00	Same for tipped and non-tipped employees. Minimum wage is $11 when it is accompanied by health insurance benefits.
New Hampshire	$3.27	
New Jersey	$5.26	Tipped wage plus tips must reach $15.13/h.
New Mexico	$3.00	Tipped wage plus tips must reach $12.00/h.
New York	$15.00	Tipped wage varies by industry but state level set at $10.00 for food service employees and $12.50 for other service employees.
North Carolina	$2.13	
North Dakota	$4.86	
Ohio	$5.25	Tipped wage plus tips must reach $10.45/h, employers who gross less than $342,000 annually will not be covered by the law.
Oklahoma	$2.13	
Oregon	Base: 15.05; Portland metro area: $16.30; Rural: $14.05	Same for tipped and non-tipped employees.
Pennsylvania	$2.83	
Rhode Island	$3.89	Tipped wage plus tips must reach $14.00/h.
South Carolina	$2.13	
South Dakota	$5.60	Tipped wage plus tips must reach $11.20/h.
Tennessee	$2.13	
Texas	$2.13	
Utah	$2.13	
Vermont	$6.84	Tipped wage plus tips must reach $13.67/h.
Virginia	$2.13	
Washington	$17.13	Same for tipped and non-tipped employees.
West Virginia	$2.62	Tipped wage plus tips must reach $8.75/h.
Wisconsin	$2.33	
Wyoming	$2.13	
US territories
Puerto Rico	$2.13	
Guam	$9.25	
Commonwealth of the Northern Mariana Islands	$2.13	
US Virgin Islands	$4.20	Tipped wage plus tips must reach $10.50/h.

== Disagreement over consequences ==
There is disagreement among economists, business leaders, and labor activists regarding whether the tipped wage should be higher and whether tipped employees should receive a different wage than non-tipped workers.

Proponents of a different wage for tipped and non-tipped workers point out that the law guarantees tipped employees the same minimum wage that other workers receive. They argue that because restaurants have very thin margins, an increase in the minimum wage could lead to higher prices for consumers and fewer jobs available for potential employees. A 2011 study suggested that 2011's WAGE Act, which would have raised the minimum wage for all tipped employees in The United States, would have led to a cumulative decrease in 11 million hours worked by tipped employees. The same research found that each 10% increase in the cash wage paid to tipped employees tends to decrease hours worked by the affected employees by 5%. A 2012 study found that eliminating the tip credit tends to decrease employment in the U.S. restaurant industry. Others express fear that eliminating the tip credit would result in fewer tips. Some argue that eliminating the tip credit exacerbates income inequality by benefiting the more well-paid servers at the expense of the non-tipped back-of-the-house staff.

In Massachusetts, where the tipped minimum wage is $2.63, the average income of tipped waiters and waitresses is $12.88. In Washington State, where the minimum wage for wait staff is $9.47, the average wage is $13.25 after gratuity. Of the five states where wait staff earn the highest average income per hour, four have a tipped minimum wage below the non-tipped minimum wage. These figures relate only to tips reported to the government for taxes, and real tips may be significantly higher.

Opponents of the current minimum wage for tipped employees point out that the tipped minimum wage has remained stagnant since 1991 despite increases in the cost of living and in the standard minimum wage over that same time. The minimum wage for tipped employees represented 50% of the standard minimum wage in 1968. By 2010, it was 29% of the non-tipped minimum wage.

They also contend that, while employers are required to ensure that all employees receive the minimum wage after tips, the current system makes it possible for some employers to illegally coerce employees to over-report tips or dock their pay so that their final income is below the minimum wage. Others argue that because tips often represent 50–90% of a waiter's income, workers’ incomes are unfairly vulnerable to fluctuations in customers’ generosity.

=== Advocates ===
One such advocate is called Restaurant Opportunities Centers United (ROCUnited). This group is a non-profit organization who stands for those within the restaurant industry and calls for changes to be made. They talk about the demographics within the restaurant industry such as 54% of those who work in the restaurant industry are women and they share the struggles with those that have some of the lowest paying jobs within the restaurant industry. A recent 2020 analysis of restaurants post-pandemic stated more than a third of all women working in the restaurant industry are mothers, and well over half are single mothers. The state of the restaurant business following the COVID-19 pandemic is that nearly six million restaurant workers lost their jobs. Poverty statistics for these workers is that 16.5% of tipped restaurant workers are in poverty and 17.6% of back-of-house workers are in poverty. On a national average as well, the U.S. livable wage is $31.90 where the tipped subminimum wage is $2.13, and the average minimum wage is $7.25.

Research has been done as well regarding tipped minimum wage when it comes to restaurant management and owners and how they have control over tips and the wages of the employees. The researchers present that a tipped minimum wage is just a way to control the labor of their employees and it also allows for owners to have more control. Employees have no control over how much they are tipped, as that is based on the customer's discretion. ROCUnited also looks to start campaigns to bring awareness to those not associated with the restaurant industry and to give workers voices. There is evidence that citizens might not know because it is information that is kept from them by those higher up within the industry. For example, the ROCUnited found through a federal review there was fraud within hour and wage reporting and some restaurants were not making up for the money they owed their employees. This led to $5.5 million in back pay and $2.5 million in penalties.

There is the concept that when it comes to increasing pay in limited time restaurants or positions, there will be a decrease in employment which can hurt the overall restaurant and even the service industry as a whole. This research also shows the breakdown of who and what job position is in the category for making less than minimum wage and those that are making minimum wage. For example, within a chart given, the tipped occupations are waitstaff, bartenders, and attendants. On the other side, those that are non-tipped occupations are cashier, cook, dishwasher, food-service managers, and counter attendants. According to the chart, waitstaff is the highest percentage of those that are less than minimum wage at 44%.

=== Opponents ===
An opponent is the National Restaurant Association (NRA). The NRA pushes to keep tipped minimum wage on a federal level. This group believes that if minimum wage were to increase for every employee, then restaurants would be forced to raise the prices on their menu which could lead to restaurant closure. The NRA argues about how the increase of minimum wage would affect those restaurants after the ending of the pandemic. Most restaurants in a study by the NRA stated that they would not be able to financially recover after the hit of the pandemic and the struggles that they already had to deal with because of the lockdowns. Employee benefits would also be in jeopardy of being cut and changed.

Research from the NRA regarding the Federal Reserve Bank in Minneapolis states that in 2018 and 2019, full-service and limited-service restaurant jobs declined by 12% and 18%. Also, that worker earnings decreased 8% and 11% at full-service and limited service restaurants. This economic impact is within a year or two of a law being passed that increased the minimum wage in 2017. Minnesota, where Minneapolis is located, is one of few states that currently has state minimum wage as the standard for tipped restaurant workers.

== See also ==
- Hospitality industry
- List of U.S. minimum wages
- Minimum wage
- Tip (gratuity)
