= Legality of cannabis by U.S. jurisdiction =

Legality of cannabis in the United States Legal for recreational use Legal for medical use No comprehensive medical program ● Decriminalized Notes: · Reflects laws of states and territories, including laws which have not yet gone into effect. Does not reflect federal, tribal, or local laws. · Map does not show state legality of hemp-derived cannabinoids such as CBD or delta-8-THC, which have been legal at federal level since enactment of the 2018 Farm Bill.

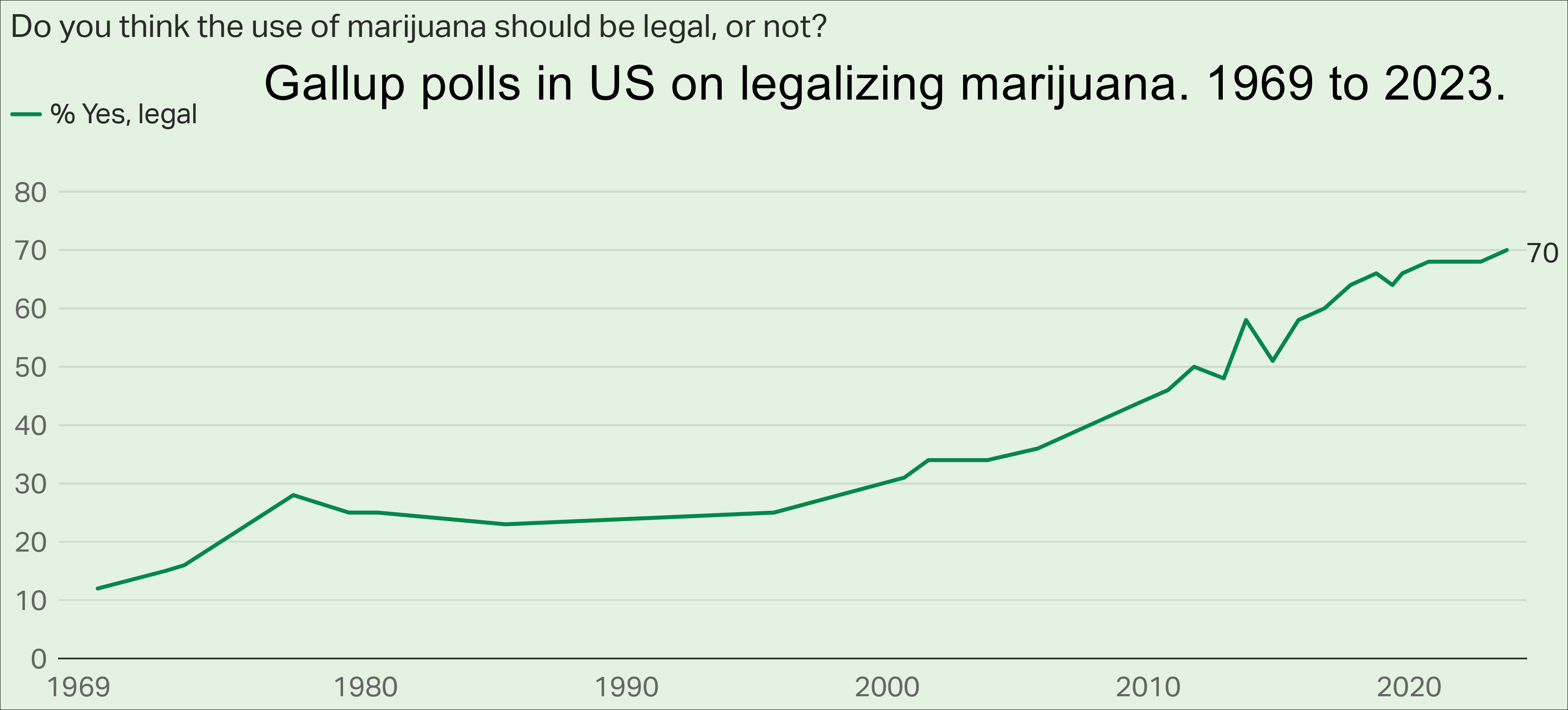
Timeline of Gallup polls in US on legalizing marijuana.

In the United States, cannabis is legal in 42 of 50 states for medical use and 24 states for recreational use. At the federal level, cannabis is generally classified as a Schedule I drug under the Controlled Substances Act, determined to have a high potential for abuse. However, licensed medical cannabis is classified as Schedule III, reflecting its medical use and lower abuse potential, while unlicensed cannabis products remain Schedule I substances. Despite these prohibitions, federal law is generally not enforced against the possession, cultivation, or intrastate distribution of cannabis in states where such activity is legal under state law. During the 117th United States Congress, a bill to decriminalize marijuana in federal law passed the House of Representatives but failed in the Senate. In April 2024, during the Biden administration, the Department of Justice initiated a process to reschedule cannabis to the less-restrictive Schedule III. Executive Order 14370, issued December 18, 2025, during the second Trump administration, expedited the process of rescheduling.

The medical use of cannabis is legal with a medical recommendation in 42 states, four out of five permanently inhabited U.S. territories, (Note: Guam, Northern Mariana Islands, Puerto Rico, U.S. Virgin Islands) and the federal District of Columbia (D.C.). Eight other states have laws that limit the psychoactive compound tetrahydrocannabinol (THC) concentration, for the purpose of allowing access to products rich in cannabidiol (CBD), a non-intoxicating component of cannabis. The Rohrabacher–Farr amendment, first passed in 2014, prohibits federal prosecution of individuals complying with state medical cannabis laws.

The recreational use of cannabis has been legalized in 24 states, three U.S. territories, and D.C. (Note: States that have legalized the use of recreational marijuana, including laws which have not yet gone into effect: Alaska, Arizona, California, Colorado, Connecticut, Delaware, Illinois, Maine, Maryland, Massachusetts, Michigan, Minnesota, Missouri, Montana, Nevada, New Jersey, New Mexico, New York, Ohio, Oregon, Rhode Island, Vermont, Virginia, and Washington Territories that have legalized recreational marijuana include: Guam, Northern Mariana Islands, U.S. Virgin Islands) Another seven states have decriminalized its use. (Note: Hawaii, Louisiana, Mississippi, Nebraska, New Hampshire, North Carolina, North Dakota) Commercial distribution has been legalized in all jurisdictions where possession has been legalized, except D.C. Personal cultivation for recreational use is allowed in all of these jurisdictions except for Delaware, Illinois, New Jersey, and Washington state.

Cannabinoid drugs which have received approval from the Food and Drug Administration (FDA) for prescription use are Marinol and Syndros (synthetic THC is the active ingredient in both), Cesamet (nabilone), and Epidiolex (CBD). For non-prescription use, products with less than 0.3% delta-9 THC containing CBD, delta-8 THC, and other naturally occurring cannabinoids derived from hemp (cannabis containing less than 0.3% delta-9 THC) are legal and unregulated at the federal level, but legality and enforcement varies by state.

Statewide legalization of recreational cannabis appeared on the ballot for the 2024 elections as 2024 Florida Amendment 3, and in North and South Dakota. It failed to pass in all 3 states. Nebraskans decided on a ballot measure related to medical cannabis the same day, which passed.

== By state ==
Contents
- Alabama
- Alaska
- Arizona
- Arkansas
- California
- Colorado
- Connecticut
- Delaware
- Florida
- Georgia
- Hawaii
- Idaho
- Illinois
- Indiana
- Iowa
- Kansas
- Kentucky
- Louisiana
- Maine
- Maryland
- Massachusetts
- Michigan
- Minnesota
- Mississippi
- Missouri
- Montana
- Nebraska
- Nevada
- New Hampshire
- New Jersey
- New Mexico
- New York
- North Carolina
- North Dakota
- Ohio
- Oklahoma
- Oregon
- Pennsylvania
- Rhode Island
- South Carolina
- South Dakota
- Tennessee
- Texas
- Utah
- Vermont
- Virginia
- Washington
- West Virginia
- Wisconsin
- Wyoming

Legend:
Legal for recreational use	Legal for medical use	No comprehensive medical program	● Decriminalized

State		Recreational	Medical	Cultivation	Notes
Alabama		Illegal; Misdemeanor for first offense, any subsequent offense is a felony	Legal to possess up to "70 daily dosages" at one time.	Illegal	Main article: Cannabis in Alabama: First-time may be punished as a misdemeanor, but further possession, or intent to sell, can result in felony charges.; Medical use legalized in May 2021 through bill signed by Governor Kay Ivey.; Registered patients are permitted to possess a maximum of "70 daily dosages" of medical cannabis at one time. Doses of authorized cannabis products are capped at a maximum of 50 milligrams for the first 90 days. First Medical Marijuana Dispensary Opened June 4, 2026. Montgomery, Al. Callie's Apothecary.
Alaska		Legal to possess up to 1 oz (28 g)	Legal to possess up to 1 oz (28 g)	Legal for medical & recreational use up to an amount of no more than 6 plants per person, or twelve plants in a household with two or more adults.	Main article: Cannabis in Alaska Legalized by Measure 2 on November 4, 2014.
Arizona		Legal to possess up to 1 oz (28 g)	Legal to possess up to 2.5 oz (71 g) per 14 days.	Legal for medical (See notes) & recreational use up to an amount of no more than 6 plants per person, or twelve plants in a household with two or more adults.	Main article: Cannabis in Arizona: Medical use legalized through Proposition 203 in 2010.; Recreational use legalized through Proposition 207 on November 3, 2020.; Medical patients may only cultivate if they're located further than 25 mi (40 km) from the nearest dispensary.
Arkansas		Illegal; Misdemeanor	Legal to possess up to 2.5 oz (71 g) per 14 days.	Illegal	Main article: Cannabis in Arkansas: Possession under 3 oz (85 g) a misdemeanor; cities of Fayetteville and Eureka Springs labeled cannabis their lowest law enforcement priority.; November 8, 2016: medical marijuana legalized when Issue 6 was approved by 53% of voters.
California		Legal to possess up to 1 oz (28 g)	Legal to possess up to 8 oz (230 g)	Legal for recreational use up to an amount of six plants per household or acre of land.	Main article: Cannabis in California: July 1975: Senate Bill 95 reduced the penalty for possession of 1 oz (28 g) or less of cannabis to a citable misdemeanor.; November 1996: first state to legalize medical marijuana when Proposition 215 was approved by 56% of voters.; November 2016: Proposition 64 passed by 57% to 43%, legalizing sale and distribution, effective January 1, 2018.
Colorado		Legal to possess up to 2 oz (57 g)	Legal to possess up to 2 oz (57 g)	Legal for medical & recreational use up to an amount of six plants per person with no more than three of which being mature at one time.	Main article: Cannabis in Colorado: 1975: Marijuana decriminalized.; November, 2000: Colorado Amendment 20 legalized medical marijuana use.; November 6, 2012: Colorado Amendment 64 approved by voters, legalizing the sale and possession of marijuana for non-medical use including cultivation of up to six plants with up to three mature.; In Denver, there is a limit of 12 plants per household regardless of the number of adults.; Colorado became the second state to legalize, going into effect four days after Washington state, however, it was the first state for legal retail sales to become established.; May 20, 2021: Colorado Governor Jared Polis signs HB 21–1090, a bill which increases possession limits from 1 oz to 2 oz for adults.
Connecticut		Legal to carry up to 1.5 oz (43 g) or possess up to 5 oz (140 g) locked inside a home or trunk of a vehicle	Legal to possess up to 5 oz (140 g) per month.	Legal for medical & recreational use up to an amount of six plants with only three at a time being mature.	Main article: Cannabis in Connecticut: June 22, 2021: Connecticut Governor Ned Lamont signed SB 1201, a bill legalizing recreational marijuana for adults beginning July 1, 2021. Those between 18 and 20 would be subject to civil fine up to $150, and minors under 18 cannot be arrested for simple possession.
Delaware		Legal to possess up to 1 oz (28 g) & 12 g (.4 oz) of concentrate	Legal to possess up to 6 oz (171 g)	Illegal	Main article: Cannabis in Delaware: May 13, 2011: Delaware legalizes medical cannabis through state legislature.; February 10, 2012: Governor Jack Markell suspended medical marijuana after a Justice Department letter threatened federal prosecution; August 31, 2016: Jack Markell signed House Bill 400, expanding medical cannabis programs for those with a terminal illness.; April 23, 2023: Bill to legalize recreational cannabis became law without governor's signature.
Florida		Illegal	Legal to possess up to three 70-day, or six 35-day "supply limits". One 35-day supply is limited to 2.5 oz (71 g).	Illegal	Main article: Cannabis in Florida: November 8, 2016: medical marijuana legalized as of July 1, 2017, when voters passed Amendment 2 by 71%.; In 2019, legislation under Senate Bill 182 was enacted, allowing individuals with eligible medical conditions to acquire smokable cannabis from authorized medical marijuana dispensaries.
Georgia		Illegal; decriminalized in the cities of Atlanta, Clarkston, Forest Park, Savannah, South Fulton, Statesboro, unincorporated Fulton County, and Macon–Bibb County.	12,000 mg THC possession limit	Illegal.	Main article: Cannabis in Georgia (U.S. state): Misdemeanor possession of 1 oz (28 g) or less can be punished by a fine up to $1000 or up to 12 months in jail. It is a felony for anyone to possess more than 1 oz (28 g), manufacture, deliver, distribute, dispense, administer, purchase, sell, or possess with intent to distribute marijuana and it is punishable by imprisonment for no less than one year and no more than ten years. City and county level punishments for misdemeanor possessions vary.; April 16, 2015: use of low-THC CBD oil legalized for medical use, but in-state cultivation, production, and sale remains illegal.; Georgia implements law allowing in-state access to low-THC oil; On April 17, 2019, Gov. Brian Kemp (R) signed Georgia's Hope Act — HB 324 — into law. This bill allows patients to safely access low-THC medical cannabis oils (with up to 5% THC) within Georgia. Sales began in the summer of 2023.; On May 12, 2026, the 5% THC limit was eliminated and a 12,000 milligram limit placed on patients.
Hawaii	●	Illegal; Decriminalized up to 0.11 oz (3 g)	Legal to possess up to 4 oz (114 g).	Legal only for medical patients up to an amount not exceeding 7 plants per person.	Main article: Cannabis in Hawaii: June 15, 2000: Governor Ben Cayetano signed bill legalizing medical marijuana. First state legislature to do so.; July 14, 2015: Governor David Ige signed bill allowing medical cannabis dispensaries.; July 14, 2016: Governor Ige signed law expanding medical cannabis programs.; June 25, 2019: Governor Ige announced that he would not veto a bill passed by the legislature to decriminalize less than 3 g of marijuana. Law went into effect January 11, 2020.
Idaho		Illegal; Misdemeanor (85 g (3.0 oz) or less)	CBD oil (less than 0.1% THC)	Illegal; Felony	Main article: Cannabis in Idaho: Possession of 85 g (3.0 oz) or less a misdemeanor up to 1-year prison or fine up to $1,000 or both. More than 3 oz (85 g) but less than 1 lb (0.45 kg) a felony up to 5 years in prison or fine up to $10,000 or both.; 2015: the Idaho Attorney General stipulated that CBD must both contain zero THC and be derived from one of the five identified parts of the cannabis plant, otherwise it is illegal in Idaho under current law.; 2021: Senate Bill 1017 is signed into law by Governor Brad Little expanding legal CBD access from 0.0% to 0.1% THC.
Illinois		Legal; Residents can possess up to 60 g (2.1 oz) of cannabis flower, 1000 mg of THC in an infused product, and 10 grams of concentrate. Nonresidents can possess up to 30 g (1.1 oz) of cannabis flower, 500 mg of THC in an infused product, and 5 grams of concentrate.	Legal to possess up to 2.5 oz (71 g) per 14 day period.	Legal only for medical patients up to an amount of 5 plants per person.	Main article: Cannabis in Illinois: Cannabis Control Act of 1978 allowed for medical marijuana but was never implemented.; August 1, 2013: Gov. Pat Quinn signed bill legalizing medical marijuana effective January 1, 2014.; May 31, 2019: the General Assembly passed the Illinois Cannabis Regulation and Tax Act to legalize recreational marijuana use beginning January 1, 2020, allowing adults age 21 and over to possess up to 30 g (1.1 oz) of cannabis flower. With Gov. J. B. Pritzker's signature on June 25, Illinois became the first state in the nation to legalize adult marijuana sales through an act of state legislature.; 2026: possession limits for Illinois residents increased to 60 g (2.1 oz) of flower, 1000 mg of THC in an infused product, and 10 grams of concentrate.
Indiana		Illegal; Misdemeanor (up to 6 months in jail, $1000 fine)	CBD oil (less than 0.3% THC) legal for any use	Illegal	Main article: Cannabis in Indiana: 1913: prohibited; Decriminalized in Marion County; Delta-8 products allowed
Iowa		Illegal; Misdemeanor	Legal to possess up to an amount of THC not exceeding 4.5 grams per 90 day period (Approx 5 Cartridges).	Illegal; Felony	Main article: Cannabis in Iowa: 2014: CBD oil legalized for less than 3% THC.; 2017: Medical program expanded to include more qualifying conditions.(Chronic pain, PTSD, Cancer, Epilepsy/seizures, Multiple sclerosis, Crohn's disease / ulcerative colitis).; 2020: THC limit changed to 4.5 grams per 90 days.
Kansas		Illegal; Misdemeanor	CBD oil (containing 0% THC) legal for any use	Illegal	Main article: Cannabis in Kansas: 1927: prohibited; 2018: CBD oil exempted from the definition of marijuana.
Kentucky		Illegal; Misdemeanor (8 oz (230 g) or less)	Legal to possess an "uninterrupted 30-day supply"	Illegal; Misdemeanor (5 plants or less)	Main article: Cannabis in Kentucky: 2014: CBD legalized; 2022: Governor Andy Beshear signed an executive order, effective January 1, 2023, to pardon anyone possessing up to 8 ounces of cannabis if purchased legally in another state and a doctor certifies that patient has one of 21 qualifying conditions.; 2023: Senate Bill 47 to legalize medical use signed into law.
Louisiana	●	Illegal; Decriminalized up to 14 grams (0.49 ounces)	Legal to possess up to a "30-day supply"	Illegal	Main article: Cannabis in Louisiana: 1924: prohibited; 2015: medical cannabis legalized; 2020: House Bill 819 is signed in to law by Governor John Bel Edwards expanding cannabis access to "any condition" that a doctor "considers debilitating to an individual patient and is qualified through his medical education and training to treat".; 2021: Decriminalization signed into law by Governor Edwards.
Maine		Legal to possess up to 2.5 oz (71 g)	Legal to possess up to 2.5 oz (71 g)	Legal for medical & recreational use up to an amount of six plants with no more than three at a time being mature. There is no limit on the amount of seedlings that can be grown at once.	Main article: Cannabis in Maine: 1913: Prohibited; 1976: Decriminalized; 1999: Medical cannabis legalized; 2009: Further decriminalized; 2016: Legalized recreational under 2016 Maine Question 1
Maryland		Legal to possess up to 1.5 oz (42 g) & 12 g (.4 oz) of concentrate	Legal to possess up to 120 g (4.2 oz) or 36 g (1.3 oz) of concentrate	Legal for recreational use up to two plants per household. Registered medical cannabis patients can grow four plants per household.	Main article: Cannabis in Maryland: 2014: decriminalized; 2022: legalized under 2022 Maryland Question 4, effective July 1, 2023
Massachusetts		Legal to possess up to 2 oz (57 g) in public or 10 oz (280 g) at home	Legal to possess up to 10 oz (280 g) per every 2-month period	Legal for recreational use up to an amount of six plants per person or twelve plants maximum for 2 or more adults in a household.	Main article: Cannabis in Massachusetts: 2008: decriminalized cannabis by 63% vote on Question 2. 1 oz (28 g) or less punishable by $100 fine.; 2012: medical marijuana legalized when Question 3 passed by 60%.; 2016: legalized recreational marijuana when Question 4 passed by 54%.; 2026: possession limit increased to 2 oz (57 g).
Michigan		Legal to possess up to 2.5 oz (71 g) in public or 10 oz (280 g) at home	Legal to possess up to 2.5 oz (71 g)	Legal for recreational use up to an amount of 12 plants per household.	Main article: Cannabis in Michigan: 2008: legalized medical cannabis under Proposal 1; 2018: legalized recreational cannabis with the voter approval of 2018 Michigan Proposal 1
Minnesota		Legal to possess up to 2 lbs (2 oz in public), 8 g of concentrate, and 800 mg of infused edibles	Legal to possess up to 2.5 oz (71 g) every 14 days.	Legal for recreational use up to an amount of 8 plants of which only 4 can be mature at a time.	Main article: Cannabis in Minnesota: 1976: decriminalization; 2014: medical cannabis legalized; 2022: Legislation is passed to allow the sale and consumption of food and beverage products containing 5 mg of THC per serving and 50 mg per package.; 2023: Governor Tim Walz signs House File 100 to legalize cannabis for recreational use, effective August 1, 2023.
Mississippi	●	Illegal; Decriminalized up to 30 g (1.1 oz) or less for first offense.	Legal to possess up to 3 oz (85 g) per month	Illegal	Main article: Cannabis in Mississippi: 1978: decriminalized; 2014: CBD legalized; 2020: medical cannabis legalized through Initiative 65, which was subsequently overturned by the Supreme Court of Mississippi; 2022: Medical use made legal again through bill signed by Governor Tate Reeves.
Missouri		Legal to possess up to 3 oz (85 g)	Legal to possess up to 6 oz (170 g) per month	Legal for medical & recreational use up to an amount of six plants per person or twelve plants for 2 or more adults in a household with a license.	Main article: Cannabis in Missouri: 2014: decriminalized; CBD legalized; 2018: Missouri voters approved Amendment 2, allowing for the distribution and regulation of medical cannabis.; 2022: Missouri voters approved Amendment 3, legalizing recreational use for adults 21 and older.
Montana		Legal to possess up to 1 oz (28 g) & 8 g of concentrates	Legal to possess up to 1 oz (28 g)	Legal for medical & recreational use up to an amount of four plants per person or 8 maximum per household, no more than 4 plants are allowed to be mature at one time.	Main article: Cannabis in Montana: November 3, 2020: Legalized by Initiative 190
Nebraska	●	Illegal; Decriminalized (first offense only)	Legal	Illegal	Main article: Cannabis in Nebraska: November 5, 2024: Ballot measures 437 and 438 were approved by voters initially legalizing medical use.; Possession for other purposes up to 1 oz (28 g) fined up to $300 for first offense, with potential mandatory drug education. Second offense fine up to $500 and up to five days' jail, third offense up to $500 fine and maximum one week jail.
Nevada		Legal to possess up to 2.5 oz (71 g) & 0.25 oz (7.1 g) of concentrate	Legal to possess up to 2.5 oz (71 g)	Legal for medical & recreational use only for people that live at least 25 mi (40 km) from the nearest dispensary. Limit is 6 plants for recreational use and 12 plants for medical use.	Main article: Cannabis in Nevada: November 7, 2000: medical marijuana legalized with 65% vote on Question 9.; November 8, 2016: recreational marijuana legalized when Question 2 passed by 54%.; Home cultivation allowed if at least 25 mi (40 km) from store.; June 8, 2023: Legal Adult-use possession limits increased from 1 oz (28 g) & one-eighth of an oz (3.5 g) of concentrate to 2.5 oz (71 g) & 0.25 oz (7.1 g) of concentrate.
New Hampshire	●	Illegal; Decriminalized up to 0.75 oz (21 g) or less	Legal to possess up to 2 oz (57 g)	Illegal	Main article: Cannabis in New Hampshire: July 23, 2013: medical marijuana legalized when Governor Maggie Hassan signed HB 573.; July 11, 2015: Governor Hassan expanded medical marijuana law.; July 18, 2017: Governor Chris Sununu signed bill decriminalizing up to 0.75 oz (21 g).
New Jersey		Legal to possess up to 6 oz (170 g). Licensed delivery services allowed.	Legal to possess up to 3 oz (85 g) per month	Illegal	Main article: Cannabis in New Jersey: January 18, 2010: medical marijuana law signed by Governor Jon Corzine. Maximum 1 year in prison and 1,000 dollar fine for possession of up to 50 grams.; September 19, 2016: Governor Chris Christie signed Assembly Bill 457 adding PTSD as a qualifying condition for medical marijuana, effective immediately.; November 3, 2020: recreational use legalized by referendum.; February 22, 2021: enabling legislation for cannabis legalization signed by Governor Phil Murphy. The bill includes provisions for transportation (delivery) and cultivation licensure.
New Mexico		Legal to possess up to 2 oz (57 g)	Legal to possess up to 8 oz (230 g) per 90-day period	Legal for medical & recreational use up to an amount not to exceed 16 plants, of which no more than 4 can be mature at one time, for medical use, and 6 mature plants, or twelve per household, for recreational use.	Main article: Cannabis in New Mexico: 2007: medical use legalized when Governor Bill Richardson signed Senate Bill 523.; 2019: legislation to decriminalize was signed into law.; 2021: recreational marijuana signed into law by Governor Michelle Lujan Grisham, effective June 29, 2021.; 2022: commercial sales began April 1, 2022.
New York		Legal to possess up to 3 oz (85 g) of cannabis or 24 g of concentrates at home and 3 oz (85 g) in public or gifting without remuneration.	Legal to possess a 60-day supply.	Legal for medical & recreational use up to an amount of three mature and three immature plants per person, with a limit of twelve per household.	Main article: Cannabis in New York: July 14, 2014: medical marijuana legalized when Governor Andrew Cuomo signed legislation allowing edibles, oils, pills, and vaporization, but not smoking.; June 20, 2019: full decriminalization bill passed legislature and signed into law by Governor Cuomo. The bill decriminalizes amounts under 2 oz (57 g), providing for a $50 fine for under 1 oz (28 g) and $100 for under 2 oz. It also eliminates the "in public view" loophole whereby police would demand suspects empty their pockets, thus causing the cannabis to be in public view. The law took effect on August 30, 2019.; March 31, 2021: Marijuana legalization law signed by the governor.
North Carolina	●	Illegal; Decriminalized up to 42 g (1.5 oz) or less	CBD oil	Illegal	Main article: Cannabis in North Carolina: 1977: decriminalized; 2015: CBD legalized
North Dakota	●	Illegal; Decriminalized up to 14 g (0.49 oz) or less	Legal to possess up to 3 oz (85 g)	Illegal	Main article: Cannabis in North Dakota: November 8, 2016: legalized medical marijuana when voters passed Measure 5 by 64%.; May 2019: decriminalized
Ohio		Legal to possess up to 2.5 oz (71 g) and up to 15 grams of cannabis concentrates.	Legal to possess a 90-day supply.	Legal to grow 6 plants per adult, maximum 12 plants per household.	Main article: Cannabis in Ohio: November 3, 2015: A recreational use initiative fails to pass.; June 8, 2016: Governor John Kasich signed legislation legalizing medical marijuana.; November 7, 2023: Ohio voters passed a ballot referendum legalizing recreational cannabis.; August 6, 2024: First commercial sales began.
Oklahoma		Illegal	Legal to possess up to 8 oz (230 g), 1 oz (28 g) of concentrate, and 72 oz (2 kg) of edibles in a residence. Patients are able to possess up to 3 oz (85 g) in public.	Legal only for medical patients up to an amount of six plants & 6 seedlings per person.	Main article: Cannabis in Oklahoma: 1933: criminalized; 2015: Governor Mary Fallin signed law allowing CBD oil for children with epilepsy.; June 26, 2018: Voters in Oklahoma approved State Question 788, legalizing medical marijuana.
Oregon		Legal to possess up to 2 oz (57 g) in public or 8 oz (230 g) at home	Legal to possess up to 24 oz (680 g)	Legal for medical & recreational use up to an amount of six mature plants & 18 seedlings for medical patients or four plants per household for recreational use.	Main article: Cannabis in Oregon: 1973: Oregon became the first state to decriminalize cannabis.; November 4, 2014: voters approved Measure 91 providing for possession and sale of set amounts of cannabis.; Cannabis sentencing reform signed July 1, 2015, by Governor Kate Brown.; More medical cannabis reforms signed July 28, 2015, by Governor Brown, effective October 1, 2015.; Governor Brown signed 25% cannabis sales tax.; January 1, 2022: Limit on personal possession increased from 1 oz to 2 oz.
Pennsylvania		Illegal; Decriminalized In Philadelphia, Pittsburgh, Harrisburg, Erie, Lancaster, Phoenixville, Norristown, State College, Steelton, Upper Merion Township, West Norriton Township, East Norriton Township, York, Folcroft, Bethlehem, Doylestown, and Allentown up to 30 g (1.1 oz)	Legal to possess up to a 90-day supply	Illegal	Main article: Cannabis in Pennsylvania: April 17, 2016: medical use law signed by Governor Wolf.; Possession (non-medical cases) of 30 g (1.1 oz) or less up to 30 days in jail and fine up to $500. More than 30g a misdemeanor up to a year in jail and $5000 fine.
Rhode Island		Legal to possess up to 1 oz (28 g)	Legal to possess up to 2.5 oz (71 g)	Legal for medical & recreational use up to an amount of 12 plants & 12 seedlings for medical patients or six plants of which no more than 3 are mature for recreational use.	Main article: Cannabis in Rhode Island Legalized by bills signed on May 25, 2022.
South Carolina		Misdemeanor	Cannabis oil (less than 0.9% THC)	Illegal	Main article: Cannabis in South Carolina: 2014: Governor Nikki Haley signed Senate Bill 1035, "Julian's Law", allowing children with severe epilepsy to be treated with CBD oil if recommended by a physician.; Apr 23 2026, Fed govt issued DOJ/DEA order placing certain FDA-approved and state-licensed medical cannabis products into Schedule III, effective immediately. South Carolina's Controlled Substances Act contains a federal conformity provision, requires the state to update its controlled substance schedules to match federal scheduling changes within 30 days (around May 23, 2026), Separately, the South Carolina Controlled Substances Therapeutic Research Act of 1980 authorizes Dept of Health to establish the Therapeutic Cannabis Research Program (TCR). South Carolina Residents with the following conditions are eligible. Cancer (specifically those undergoing chemotherapy), Glaucoma, and Patients receiving radiation therapy (or related radiology treatment contexts described in the law).
South Dakota		Misdemeanor	Legal to possess up to 3 oz (85 g)	Legal for medical patients up to an amount not exceeding 2 flowering, and 2 non-flowering plants; more in some cases.	Main article: Cannabis in South Dakota Possession of 2 oz or less a Class 1 misdemeanor punishable by a maximum of 1 year in prison and a maximum fine $2,000. Medical use legal effective July 1, 2021.: November 3, 2020: Medical and recreational use legalized by separate referendums.; February 8, 2021: Recreational legalization referendum (Amendment A) overturned by circuit court judge as unconstitutional.; On November 24, 2021, the South Dakota Supreme Court ruled 4–1 that Amendment A was unconstitutional, striking down recreational legalization.
Tennessee		Illegal; Misdemeanor (less than .5 oz (14 g); first or second offense only).	Cannabis oil (less than 0.9% THC)	Illegal; Misdemeanor (nine plants or less), Felony (ten or more plants)	Main article: Cannabis in Tennessee First-time possession one year supervised probation instead of one year in prison; possession of .5 oz (14 g) or more for resale a felony. CBD oil possession allowed as of May 4, 2015, if suffering seizures or epilepsy with recommendation of doctor.
Texas		Illegal; De facto legal by not arresting for less than 4 oz (112 g) in possession in Austin. A "cite and release" policy is in effect in Houston, Dallas, San Antonio, Austin, and residents of Travis County).	Legal to possess medically. Patients may now access up to 10 mg of THC per serving and 1 gram per package, and are permitted to vape and nebulize THC products in addition to other forms.	Illegal	Main article: Cannabis in Texas: December 2014: possession of up to 2 oz (57 g) of marijuana can result in a jail sentence of up to six months and fine of up to $2,000.; June 1, 2015: governor Greg Abbott signed a bill legalizing CBD oil for medical use in patients with intractable epilepsy.; May 2019: expanded the qualifying conditions of medical cannabis to include Parkinson's disease, ALS, autism, multiple sclerosis, spasticity, and terminal cancer.; June 2021: Governor Greg Abbott signed a bill that expands limited medical program from 0.5% THC to 1.0% THC. Effective September 1, 2021.; June 21, 2025: Governor Greg Abbott signed a bill expanding limited medical program to a full medical program. Patients may now access up to 10 mg of THC per serving and 1 gram per package, and are permitted to vape and nebulize THC products in addition to other forms.
Utah		Illegal; Misdemeanor	Legal to possess up to 4 oz (113 g) per 30-day period	Illegal	Main article: Cannabis in Utah: 2014: HB 105 signed which allows use of low-THC cannabis oil for patients with epilepsy.; March 2018: HB 195 signed which allows cannabis for certain terminally ill patients.; Nov 16, 2018 Utah voters passed Proposition 2 — the Utah Medical Cannabis Act.; Dec 3, 2018 Replaced by Legislature with HB 3001 — the Utah Medical Cannabis Act. Governor Gary Herbert signed it into law the same day, and it took immediate effect. Qualifying conditions Chronic pain, PTSD, Cancer, Epilepsy / seizures, Multiple sclerosis, Crohn's disease/ulcerative colitis, Autism, Persistent nausea, Terminal illness / hospice care.; Possession up to 1 oz (28 g) 6-months prison and maximum fine $1,000. Over 10 oz (280 g) $10,000 fine. Selling any amount a felony with 5 years in prison and $5,000 fine.
Vermont		Legal to possess up to 2 oz (57 g) of cannabis and 10 g of hashish.	Legal to possess up to 2 oz (57 g)	Legal for medical & recreational use up to an amount of 9 plants, with only 2 at a time being mature for medical patients, or six plants for recreational use of which no more than two can be mature at one time.	Main article: Cannabis in Vermont: May 19, 2004: medical marijuana legalized when Senate Bill 76 was enacted.; June 2007: medical marijuana expanded by the enactment of SB 7.; June 6, 2013: Governor Peter Shumlin signed HB200, decriminalizing 1 oz (28 g).; January 2018: HB511 was enacted, legalizing recreational use of 1 oz (28 g) and two plants, taking effect on July 1, 2018. First state legislature to legalize recreational marijuana.; 2026: possession limit increased to 2 oz (57 g).
Virginia		Legal to possess up to 1 oz (28 g) in public; no limit applies at home. Legislature has authorized retail sales start July 1, 2027.	Legal to possess up to 4 oz (113 g) per 30-day period; unlike recreational use, commercial sales of medical marijuana is legal.	Legal for medical & recreational use up to an amount of 4 plants per household.	Main article: Cannabis in Virginia: April 2020: decriminalized up to 1 oz (28 g) (punishable by a $25 fine) per legislation signed by Governor Ralph Northam.; April 7, 2021: Legalized for recreational use effective July 1, 2021. Retail sales scheduled to begin by July 1, 2027, legislature developed the necessary legal framework.
Washington		Legal to possess up to 1 oz (28 g)	Legal to possess up to 3 oz (85 g), 48 oz (1.3 kg) of edibles, 21 g (.74 oz) of concentrate, & 216 oz (6.1 kg) of infused-liquids.	Legal for medical patients only up to an amount of 6 plants.	Main article: Cannabis in Washington (state): 2012: legalized by Washington Initiative 502. The law permits anyone over 21 to carry 1 oz (28 g), and it requires licensed sellers, distributors, and growers. Home growing is not allowed except for medical use. First state to legalize recreational marijuana on December 6, 2012, four days before Colorado.
West Virginia		Illegal; Misdemeanor	Legal	Illegal	Main article: Cannabis in West Virginia "Compassionate Use Act for Medical Cannabis; providing for protections for the medical use of cannabis..."
Wisconsin		Illegal; Misdemeanor on first offense, felony on subsequent offenses; possession under 25 or 28 grams considered an ordinance violation in most incorporated municipalities, and decriminalized in the cities of Milwaukee and Madison	CBD oil	Illegal; Felony	Main article: Cannabis in Wisconsin: First possession a misdemeanor fine up to $1,000 or imprisonment up to 6 months, or both. Second offense a Class I felony fine up to $10,000 or imprisonment up to 3.5 years, or both.; Medical CBD oil legalized in 2014 and 2017.; In 2020, Madison, WI legalized the possession of up to 1 oz (28 g) of recreational cannabis, including smoking cannabis on public property (not including places where cigarettes are already banned, inside or within 1,000 feet (300 m) of a school, or behind the wheel).
Wyoming		Illegal; Misdemeanor	CBD oil	Illegal	Main article: Cannabis in Wyoming Being under the influence of marijuana is a misdemeanor up to 90 days in prison and fine up to $100. Possession of 3 oz (85 g) or less a misdemeanor up to 1 year in prison and fine up to $1000.

== Federal district ==
District	Recreational	Medical	Cultivation	Notes
District of Columbia	Legal to possess up to 2 oz (57 g). No commercial sales.	Legal to possess up to 8 oz (230 g)	Legal for recreational use up to an amount of six plants with only three being mature at a time; there are no provisions for commercial recreational cultivation.	Main article: Cannabis in Washington, D.C.: 1998: Initiative 59 was voted in to allow medical marijuana, but was blocked from taking effect by Congress until 2009.; 2014: D.C. Mayor Vincent Gray signed a bill that decriminalized possession of up to 1 oz (28 g) of marijuana in the U.S. capital for persons 18 years of age or older. The law made possession a civil violation with a penalty of $25, lower than most city parking tickets.; 2014, D.C. voted by ballot Initiative 71 to legalize recreational marijuana possession, cultivation, and transportation; commercial production and sale prohibited. The law went into effect February 26, 2015, following 30 days of congressional review.

== By inhabited territory ==
Territory	Recreational	Medical	Cultivation	Notes
American Samoa	Illegal	Illegal	Illegal	Main article: Cannabis in American Samoa: In 1999, the territory established a five-year mandatory minimum sentence for possession of any amount of any illegal drug, to explicitly include marijuana, even when medically prescribed in another jurisdiction.
Guam	Legal to possess up to 1 oz (28 g) & 8 g of concentrate	Legal to possess up to 2.5 oz (71 g)	Legal for medical & recreational use up to an amount not exceeding 6 mature & 12 immature plants for medical patients or up to 6 immature & 3 mature plants for recreational use.	Main article: Cannabis in Guam: November 4, 2014: residents passed a ballot measure that allows cannabis for medical use only.; March 2019: the Legislature of Guam passed a bill (by a close vote of 8–7) to legalize recreational cannabis. The Governor of Guam signed the bill into law on April 4, 2019, with immediate effect.
Northern Mariana Islands	Legal	Legal	Legal for medical & recreational use up to an amount of 6 mature and 12 immature plants.	Main article: Cannabis in the Northern Mariana Islands: September 21, 2018: Republican governor Ralph Torres signed a bill into law to legalize the recreational use of cannabis in the territory.
Puerto Rico	Illegal	Legal to possess up to a 30-day supply.	Illegal	Main article: Cannabis in Puerto Rico: May 4, 2015: the governor of Puerto Rico signed an executive order legalizing medicinal marijuana in the U.S. territory.
U.S. Virgin Islands	Legal to possess up to 2 oz (57 g), 1 oz (28 g) of edibles, & 14 g (.5 oz) of concentrate	Legal to possess up to 4 oz (113 g)	Legal for medical patients up to an amount of 12 plants. Cultivation for non-medical use is only legal for sacramental purposes.	Main article: Cannabis in the United States Virgin Islands: December 2014: possession of up to 1 oz (28 g) was decriminalized.; January 2019: medical use was legalized.; January 2023: Bill to legalize recreational use signed by Governor Albert Bryan on January 18, 2023.

== By tribal nation ==
Note: There are approximately 326 federally recognized Indian reservations in the United States. This table shows only reservations which are known to have legalized medical or recreational use of cannabis, and may not be a complete list of reservations that have done so.

Reservation	Recreational	Medical	Cultivation	Notes
Flandreau Santee Sioux Tribe (South Dakota)	Legal	Legal	Illegal; Only one site has been allowed as the primary growing location.	In summer 2015, the tribal authorities voted 5–1 to legalize recreational cannabis, making them the first reservation to do so following the 2013 Cole Memorandum.
Oglala Lakota Sioux Tribe (South Dakota)	Legal	Legal	Legal	Legalized by referendum in March 2020, ordinance effective November 27, 2020.
Suquamish Tribe (Washington state)	Legal	Legal	Legal	In September 2015, the tribe signed the nation's first tribe-state cannabis pact, under which the tribe would operate a cannabis retail store with regulations paralleling those of Washington state.
Squaxin Island Tribe (Washington state)	Legal	Legal	Legal	Legalized in November 2015.
Eastern Band of Cherokee Indians (North Carolina)	Legal	Legal	Illegal	Tribal council voted in May 2021 to allow possession of up to one ounce.; Voters approved a September 2023 referendum directing the tribal council to allow recreational sales.
St. Regis Mohawk Tribe (New York)	Legal	Legal	Legal for medical & recreational use up to an amount of twelve plants.	Legislation approved in June 2021 legalizing recreational use of cannabis and establishing a dispensary license program where all growing, processing, and sales must take place on tribal land.
Tuscarora Reservation (New York)	Legal	Legal	Legal	Only legal to buy and sell if you're a land owner in the Tuscarora Reservation, little to no regulations.
Omaha Reservation (Nebraska)	Legal	Legal		

== Legalization timeline ==
United States jurisdictions with legalized recreational cannabis
Jurisdiction	Effective date	Licensed sales since	Legalization method
Washington (state)	December 6, 2012	July 8, 2014	Initiated ballot measure
Colorado	December 10, 2012	January 1, 2014	Initiated ballot measure
Alaska	February 24, 2015	October 29, 2016	Initiated ballot measure
Washington, D.C.	February 26, 2015	Never authorized	Initiated ballot measure
Oregon	July 1, 2015	October 1, 2015	Initiated ballot measure
California	November 9, 2016	January 1, 2018	Initiated ballot measure
Massachusetts	December 15, 2016	November 20, 2018	Initiated ballot measure
Nevada	January 1, 2017	July 1, 2017	Initiated ballot measure
Maine	January 30, 2017	October 9, 2020	Initiated ballot measure
Vermont	July 1, 2018	October 1, 2022	Legislative bill
Northern Mariana Islands	September 21, 2018	July 16, 2021	Legislative bill
Michigan	December 6, 2018	December 1, 2019	Initiated ballot measure
Guam	April 4, 2019	Not yet started	Legislative bill
Illinois	January 1, 2020	January 1, 2020	Legislative bill
Arizona	November 30, 2020	January 22, 2021	Initiated ballot measure
Montana	January 1, 2021	January 1, 2022	Initiated ballot measure
New Jersey	February 22, 2021	April 21, 2022	Legislatively referred ballot measure
New York	March 31, 2021	December 29, 2022	Legislative bill
New Mexico	June 29, 2021	April 1, 2022	Legislative bill
Connecticut	July 1, 2021	January 10, 2023	Legislative bill
Virginia	July 1, 2021	July 1, 2027	Legislative bill
Rhode Island	May 25, 2022	December 1, 2022	Legislative bill
Missouri	December 8, 2022	February 3, 2023	Initiated ballot measure
United States Virgin Islands	January 18, 2023	Not yet started	Legislative bill
Delaware	April 23, 2023	August 1, 2025	Legislative bill
Maryland	July 1, 2023	July 1, 2023	Legislatively referred ballot measure
Minnesota	August 1, 2023	September 16, 2025	Legislative bill
Ohio	December 7, 2023	August 6, 2024	Initiated ballot measure

== More maps ==
Delta-8 THC legal status by US state.

Legal, Federally Unregulated
Legal, State Regulated
Illegal

Cannabis offense record clearance by state.

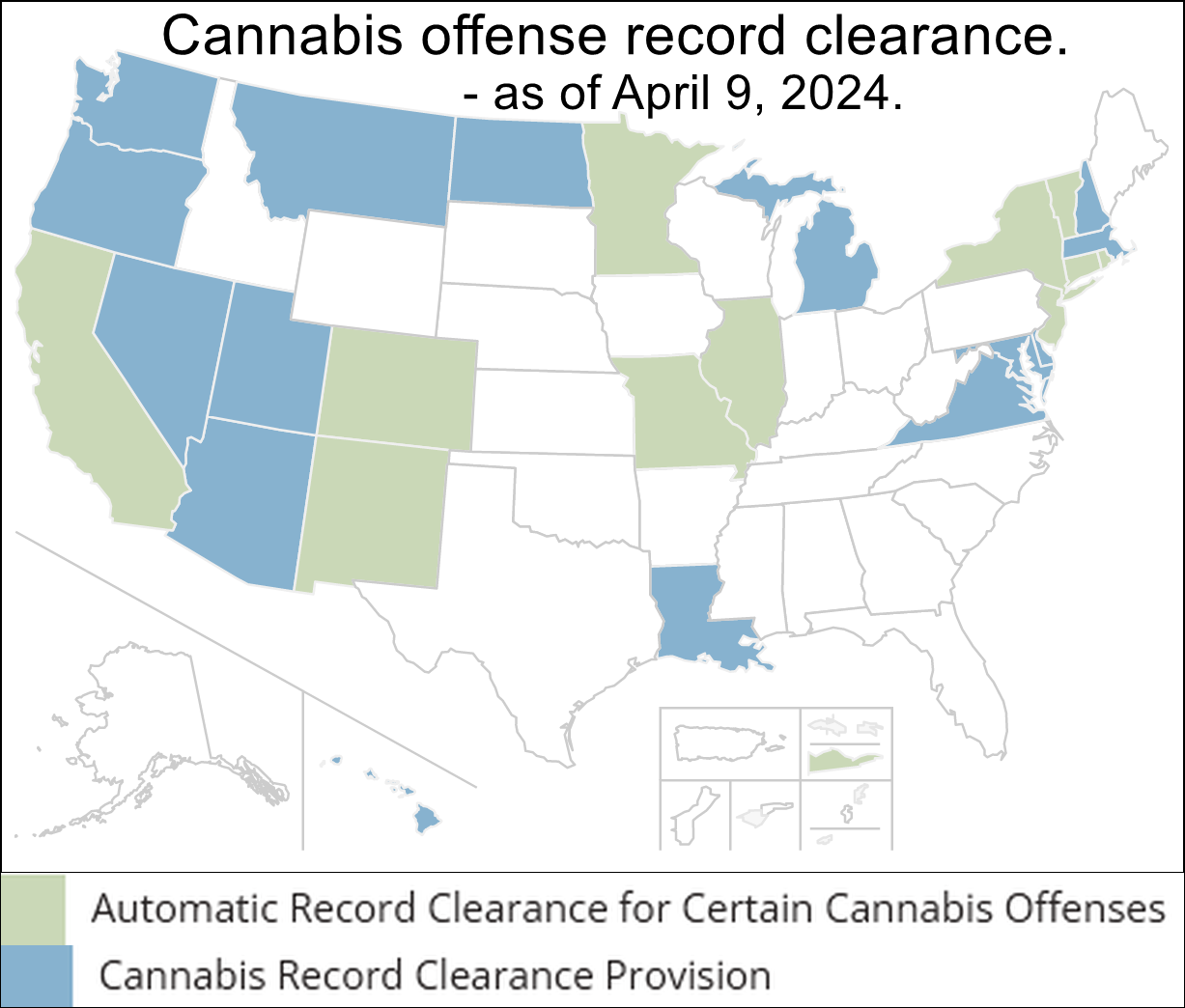

== Gallery of universal symbols ==
Universal symbols mandated by state law for legal cannabis packaging
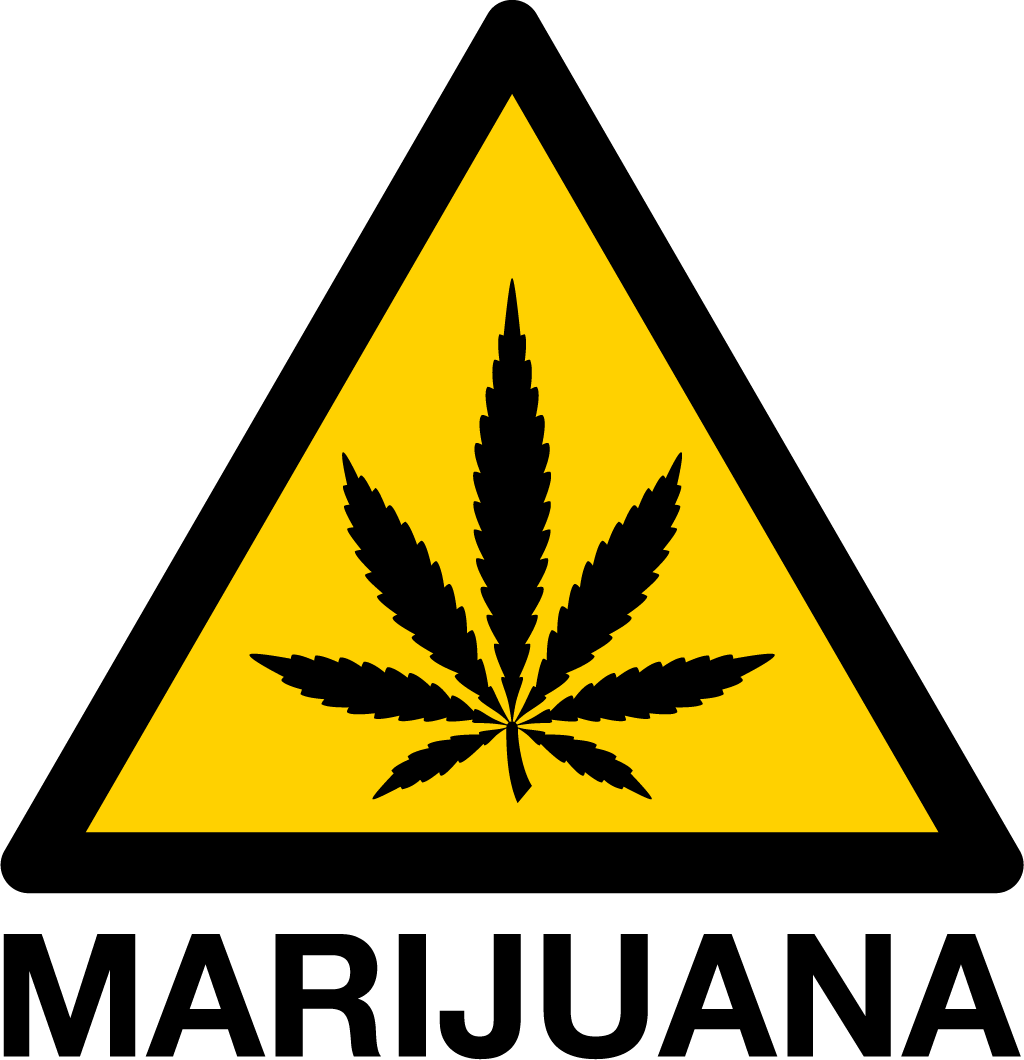
Alaska, Montana, South Dakota, Vermont, and Virginia
(ASTM D8441/D8441M)

Arizona, Colorado, Florida, and Ohio

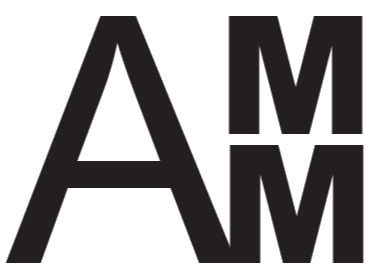
Arkansas

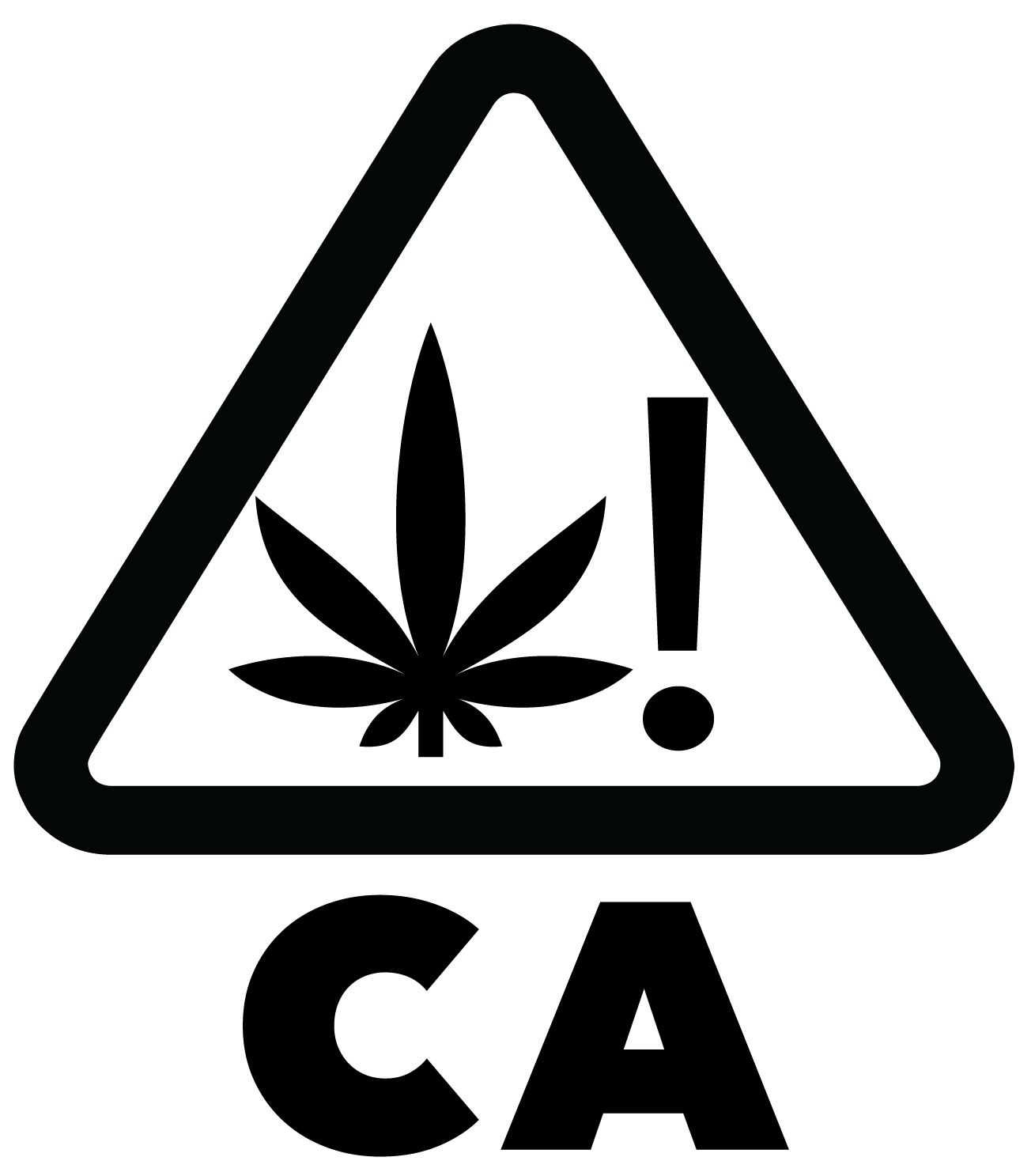
California

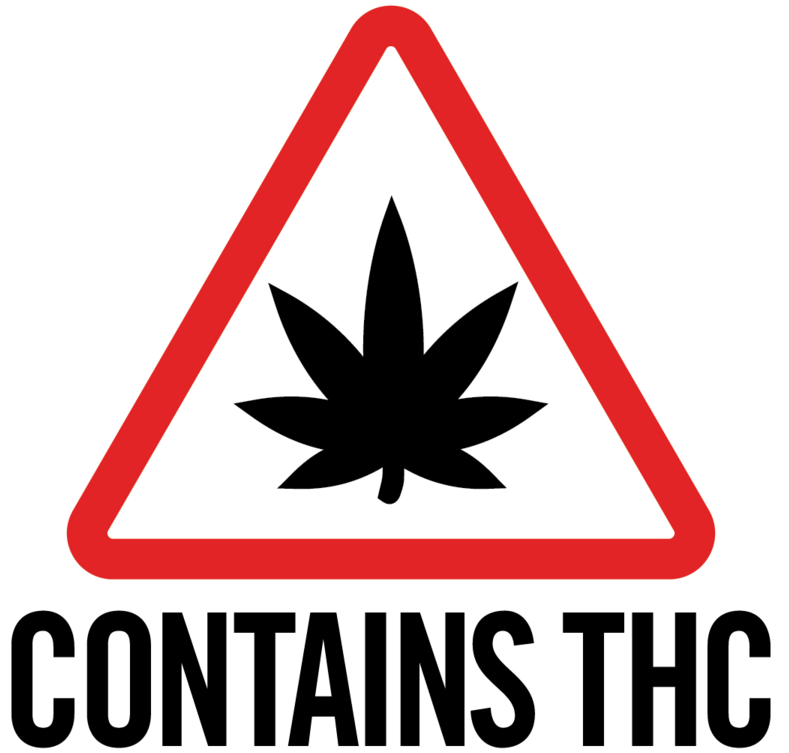
Connecticut, Maine, Massachusetts, and Rhode Island

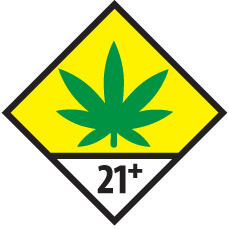
Guam and Washington state

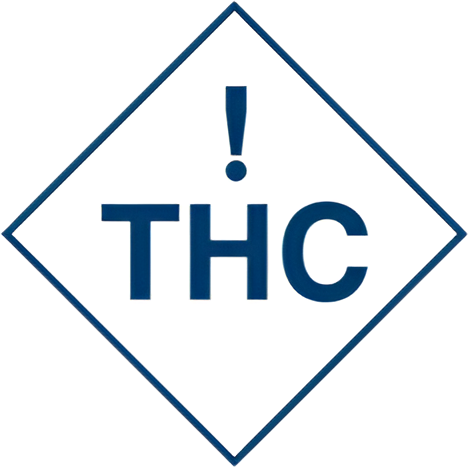
Kentucky

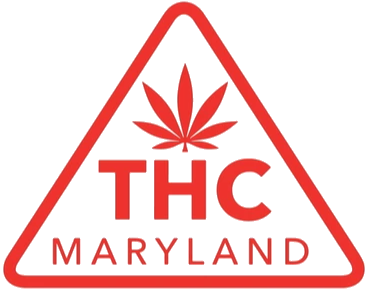
Maryland

Michigan

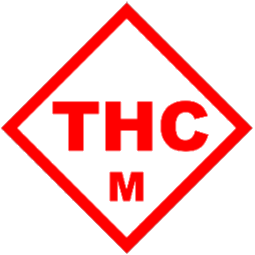
Missouri

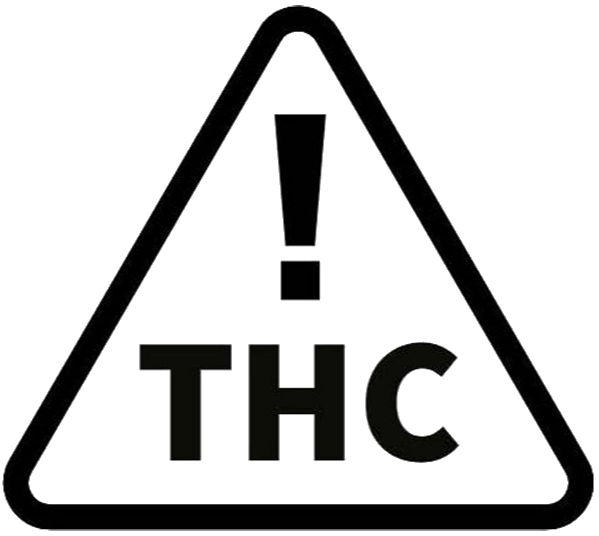
Nevada

New Jersey

New Mexico

New York

Oklahoma

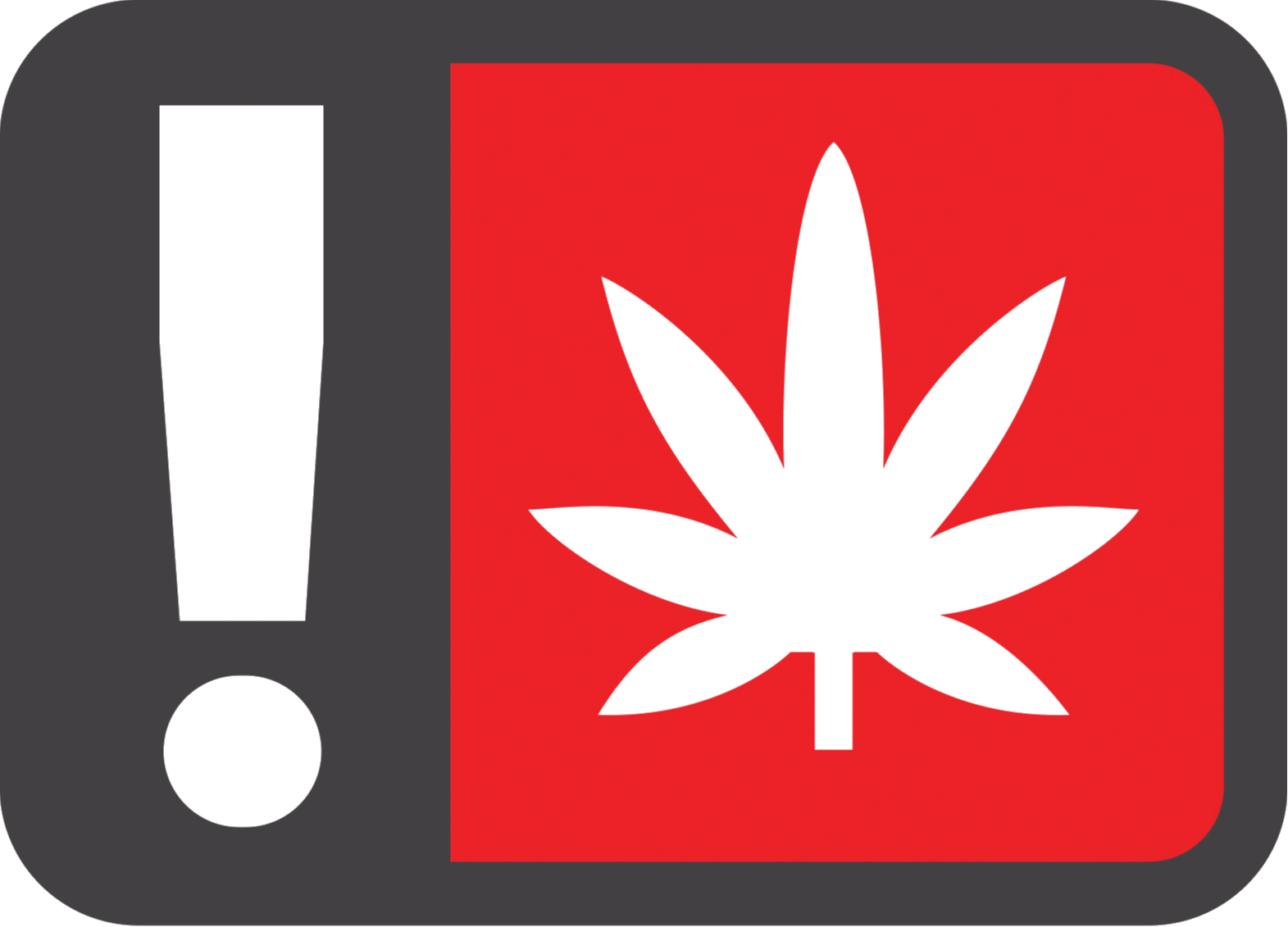
Oregon

== See also ==
- Cannabis and border towns in the United States
- Cannabis laws of Canada by province or territory
- Legal history of cannabis in the United States
- Legality of cannabis
- List of United States cannabis regulatory agencies
- Solomon–Lautenberg amendment ("Smoke a joint, lose your license" laws)
- Timeline of cannabis laws in the United States
