= Cannabis in Georgia =

Cannabis in Georgia may refer to:

- Cannabis in Georgia (country), about the country in the Caucasus region
- Cannabis in Georgia (U.S. state), about one of the states that make up the United States
