= Protect Our Kids =

American political action committee against drugs

- Formation: March 2022
- Legal status: Active
- Purpose: Oppose legalization and normalization of drugs.

Protect Our Kids is a political action committee (PAC) created to oppose the legalization and normalization of drugs in the United States in 2022. A so-called super PAC, Protect Our Kids is permitted to raise and spend unlimited amounts of corporate, union, and individual campaign contributions under the terms of the Citizens United Supreme Court decision.

Protect Our Kids was created by Luke Niforatos, a national drug policy expert and advocate against drug legalization, in March 2022. One of the first actions of the PAC was to oppose the re-election of Republican U.S. Representative Nancy Mace, who had introduced the States Reform Act that would remove cannabis from Schedule I of the Controlled Substances Act (known as de-scheduling).

The organization funding of lawsuits failed to remove the 2022 Missouri marijuana legalization initiative from the November ballot in Missouri, after it was certified by Secretary of State Jay Ashcroft.

== See also ==
- Cannabis in the United States
- Legality of cannabis by U.S. jurisdiction
