= Cannabis in Delaware =

Cannabis in Delaware is legal for medicinal and recreational use. Possession and use by adults 21 and older became legal on April 23, 2023, with the first licensed sales occurring on August 1, 2025.

== Medical cannabis (2011) ==
In May 2011, Governor Jack Markell signed legislation allowing patients 18 and older to possess up to six ounces if they had certain qualifying medical conditions such as cancer, Alzheimer's disease, post-traumatic stress disorder, and conditions that cause intractable nausea, severe pain or seizures, among others.

State data on patients who received marijuana cards in 2015 showed that the primary medical conditions being treated for cardholders were pain (36.3%), muscle spasms (21.6%), and cancer (9.3%).

The first medical marijuana clinic in Delaware opened in Wilmington in June 2015. As of that date, some 340 Delaware residents held cards from the Delaware Health and Social Services, allowing them to purchase marijuana in order to treat their medical conditions. However, as of 2016, medical-marijuana cardholders still struggled to obtain approved cannabis.

The medical marijuana legislation provided that all three of the state's counties – New Castle, Kent, and Sussex – must have a licensed dispensary - known in Delaware as a Compassion Center - by January 1, 2013. However, only a single facility (the Wilmington facility in New Castle County) had opened as of 2016.

== Decriminalization (2015) ==
In June 2015, Markell signed a law that decriminalized the possession of one ounce or less of marijuana by adults. Possession of marijuana remains a civil infraction that carries a $100 fine. The bill passed along party lines, with all Republican legislators opposing it. Under the legislation, it remains illegal for minors (persons under age 21) to possess cannabis. Additionally, smoking cannabis "in a moving vehicle, in public areas, or outdoors on private property within 10 feet [3 m] of a street, sidewalk or other area accessible to the public" is also a misdemeanor.

The decriminalization bill took effect in December 2015.

== Legalization proposals ==
There have been a few attempts to legalize marijuana in Delaware, starting in 2017 by State Rep. Helene Keeley, but such bills failed to receive the required number of votes in the Delaware legislature. Some Democratic colleagues abstained from the vote, citing concerns over the bill's cost.

The most recent push to legalize Recreational marijuana in Delaware was picked up by State Rep. Ed Osienski, who attempted to get a bill passed during the 2020 general assembly session, but failed due to a lack of votes and because of the COVID-19 pandemic. Osienski reworked the bill to introduce it during the 2021 legislative session. Some of those changes included adding a 'social equity' and microbusiness license, through which Osienski says "they’ll get some additional help with applying and some reduction in fees."

== 2022 Delaware General Assembly passage ==
In May 2022, the Delaware General Assembly formally passed a bill to legalize cannabis for recreational use. On May 24, 2022, the Governor of Delaware, John Carney, vetoed the bill. On June 7, the Delaware House of Representatives failed to override Carney's veto.

== 2023 Delaware General Assembly passage ==
Delaware HB1, a legalization bill, and HB2, to regulate and tax sales, were introduced on January 20. HB1 was approved by the House on March 7, and HB2 was approved on March 9. The bills were approved by the senate on March 28, to be sent to the governor to become law. HB 1 was transmitted to the governor on April 11, and HB2 on April 14. Carney released a statement on April 21 that both bills would come into effect as law with neither his signature nor veto. He stated that although he still opposes legalization, it is time to "move on" from the issue. Legalization came into effect on April 23, 2023. The first licensed cannabis sales occurred over two years later on August 1, 2025.

== See also ==
- Legality of cannabis by U.S. jurisdiction
