= 2022 Missouri Amendment 3 =

Constitutional Amendment 3
- November 8, 2022
- Marijuana Legalization Initiative

Results
Choice	Votes	%
Yes	1,092,432	53.10%
No	965,020	46.90%
Total votes	2,057,452	100.00%

Yes
70–80%
60–70%
50–60%
No
70–80%
60–70%
50–60%

2022 Missouri Constitutional Amendment 3, also known as the Marijuana Legalization Initiative, was a ballot measure to amend the Constitution of Missouri to legalize recreational marijuana in Missouri. The measure was on the November 8, 2022, general election ballot and was passed with 53.1% of the vote. It took effect on December 8, 2022, and commercial marijuana sales began two months later, in February 2023.

== Background ==
The Controlled Substances Act (CSA), enacted in 1970 and signed by President Richard Nixon, classified cannabis—also known as marijuana—as a Schedule I controlled substance. Designation under this standard meant that, in federal law, marijuana is considered to have no medicinal value, and a high propensity for abuse. Criminalization gradually came into force in the proceeding few decades, with marijuana becoming one of the most focal targets in the war on drugs. However, because of the federalist system the United States government operates, states are allowed to develop their own regulatory frameworks for controlled substances and, under the anticommandeering doctrine, are not required to enforce regulations derived from the CSA.

Amendment 3 was filed with the secretary of state for approval in August 2021, and was qualified for signature gathering on October 6, 2021. The sponsoring organization's campaign manager said on May 4, 2022, that they were "confident" that the number of signatures collected by that date, a few days before the deadline, "provides the necessary cushion to qualify for the ballot". On the May 8 deadline, twice the minimum number of signatures were submitted. On August 9, 2022, The Missouri Secretary of State, Jay Ashcroft, certified the initiative to appear as Amendment 3 on the November ballot.

In September 2022, lawmakers pushed to have cannabis added to a special session called by Governor Mike Parson, over disagreements with policies outlined in Amendment 3, particularly with licensing. A bill entitled the Marijuana Freedom Act was filed to address these concerns. Despite calling Amendment 3 a "disaster", Governor Parson did not expand the scope of the special session to include cannabis, killing the challenge to Amendment 3.

== Contents ==
The amendment appeared on the ballot as follows:

Do you want to amend the Missouri Constitution to:

- remove state prohibitions on purchasing, possessing, consuming, using, delivering, manufacturing, and selling marijuana for personal use for adults over the age of twenty-one;
- require a registration card for personal cultivation with prescribed limits;
- allow persons with certain marijuana-related non-violent offenses to petition for release from incarceration or parole and probation and have records expunged;
- establish a lottery selection process to award licenses and certificates;
- issue equally distributed licenses to each congressional district;
- and impose a six percent tax on the retail price of marijuana to benefit various programs?

State governmental entities estimate initial costs of $3.1 million, initial revenues of at least $7.9 million, annual costs of $5.5 million, and annual revenues of at least $40.8 million. Local governments are estimated to have annual costs of at least $35,000 and annual revenues of at least $13.8 million.

Missouri Department of Health and Senior Services is directed to conduct cannabis licensing and regulation.

The provisions of the amendment would officially go into effect on December 8, 2022.

== Campaigns ==
There has been opposition to the scheme's licensing caps giving an advantage to existing medical dispensary license holders due to existing medical license holders being first in line for recreational licenses, raising questions about "fairness and equity". A competing bill without caps was introduced in the state legislature. It failed after it was amended with two provisions labeled "poison pills", including licensing caps. There has also been opposition due to there not being an automatic expungement of criminal records.

On August 22, 2022, on the last day of the 10-day challenge period following certification, the prohibitionist organization Protect Our Kids funded a lawsuit to remove the initiative from the November ballot. The lawsuit was dismissed on September 9. The Associated Press used the suit as an example of "pushback against the initiative process [that] is part of a several-year trend that gained steam as groups aligned with the Democratic Party have increasingly used petitions to force public votes on issues that Republican-led legislatures have opposed". On September 13, the deadline for challenges, the state supreme court allowed the initiative to appear on the ballot by refusing to review a lower court's decision to reject an appeal.

Protect Our Kids PAC opposed the initiative.

In March 2022, the Missouri ACLU endorsed the initiative.

== Results ==
The amendment was approved by voters on November 8, 2022, by a 53–47% margin. Despite initially saying that recreational sales would begin on February 6, 2023, the Missouri Department of Health and Senior Services unexpectedly announced on February 2 that licenses would be issued to recreational dispensaries the following day.

Constitutional Amendment 3
Choice	Votes	%
For	1,092,432	53.10
Against	965,020	46.90
Total	2,057,452	100.00

== See also ==
- Cannabis in Missouri
- List of 2022 United States cannabis reform proposals
- List of Missouri ballot measures
- 2022 Missouri elections
