= Cannabis in Missouri =

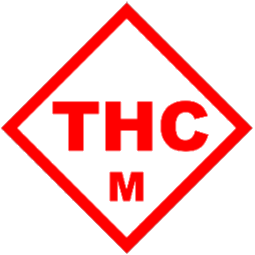
Missouri's Cannabis Universal Symbol

Cannabis in Missouri is legal for recreational use. A ballot initiative to legalize recreational use, Amendment 3, passed by a 53–47 margin on November 8, 2022. Possession for adults 21 and over became legal on December 8, 2022, with the first licensed sales occurring on February 3, 2023.

Medical use was legalized through the passage of a 2018 ballot measure by a 66–34 margin. The first licensed sales began in October 2020.

== State level reforms ==
=== Partial decriminalization (2014) ===
In May 2014, Senate Bill 491 was enacted which reduced penalties for certain cannabis offenses. In particular, it eliminated the threat of jail time for first-time possession of up to 10 grams (1/3 oz). The bill also reduced penalties related to the sale and cultivation of cannabis, and eliminated the ban on probation or parole for third-time drug felony convictions. It passed the Senate by a 29–2 vote and the House 140–15, then became law without receiving the signature of Governor Jay Nixon. SB 491 did not take effect until January 2017.

Although penalties for cannabis were reduced under SB 491, possession of small amounts was still treated as a misdemeanor crime. For this reason the National Organization for the Reform of Marijuana Laws considered Missouri to only have partially decriminalized cannabis.

=== CBD oil legalized (2014) ===
In July 2014, Governor Nixon signed into law House Bill 2238 – the Missouri Medical Marijuana Bill – to legalize the use of CBD oil to treat persistent seizures. The legislation "allows the Department of Agriculture to grow industrial hemp for research purposes and allows the use of hemp extract to treat certain individuals with epilepsy". A neurologist must determine that the epilepsy does not respond to at least three treatment options in order for a person to be eligible. HB 2238 only allows hemp extract that contains at least 5% cannabidiol (CBD) and no more than 0.3% tetrahydrocannabinol (THC).

In February 2015, the state issued licenses to two non-profits to grow cannabis to produce the oil.

=== Medical cannabis legalized (2018) ===
In November 2018, Missouri residents approved with 66% of the vote a ballot measure (Amendment 2) to legalize the medical use of cannabis. The measure allows qualified patients to grow up to six cannabis plants and purchase an amount of cannabis per month to be determined by state regulators (required to be at least 4 ounces). The measure set a 4% tax rate on medical cannabis sales with proceeds to be earmarked for services for military veterans. Although several qualifying conditions are specified, the law additionally allows cannabis to be recommended for any "chronic, debilitating or other medical condition" for which a physician determines there would be a benefit, as well as for any terminal illness.

Also on the ballot with Amendment 2 were two other medical cannabis initiatives that were defeated. Amendment 3 contained a narrower set of qualifying conditions, a higher tax rate of 15 percent, and would not have allowed home cultivation. It failed with 32 percent of the vote. A third measure, Proposition C, was a statutory change as opposed to a constitutional amendment. It set a two percent tax rate and also contained no home grow provision. It failed with 44 percent of the vote.

The first licensed sales of medical cannabis occurred on October 17, 2020. By this time there were 192 licensed dispensaries in the state, most of which were expected to open by the end of the year.

=== Recreational cannabis legalized (2022) ===
On August 9, 2022, Secretary of State Jay Ashcroft announced that an initiative would appear on the November 2022 ballot to legalize cannabis for recreational use. Designated as Amendment 3 on the ballot, the initiative sought to:

- allow adults 21 and over to possess up to three ounces of cannabis
- allow home cultivation of six flowering cannabis plants, six nonflowering plants, and six clones for registered individuals who pay a $100 annual fee
- allow the sale of cannabis at dispensaries licensed by the state with a 6% sales tax imposed
- divide tax revenue up between expunging non-violent cannabis offenses, providing healthcare for veterans, providing substance abuse treatment, and funding the state's public defender system
- allow local governments to assess a sales tax of up to 3%

On November 8, 2022, Missouri voters approved Amendment 3 by a 53–47 margin. Possession of cannabis for adults 21 and over became legal on December 8, 2022. The first licensed sales of recreational cannabis occurred on February 3, 2023.

== Municipal level reforms ==
=== Columbia (2004) ===
In November 2004, a ballot measure to decriminalize cannabis in Columbia passed with 61% of the vote. The measure stipulated that possession of up to 35 grams (1 1/4 oz) was to be processed in municipal court as a non-criminal offense, punishable by a maximum fine of $250. Also passed with 69% of the vote was an initiative to allow the use of cannabis with a physician's approval.

A year earlier, in April 2003, a ballot measure to decriminalize cannabis in the city failed with 42% of the vote.

=== Springfield (2012) ===
In August 2012, the city council of Springfield voted 6–3 to enact (rather than let go to ballot) a citizen-led petition to decriminalize small amounts of cannabis. It was then repealed one month later, however, in effect blocking the proposal (which had obtained the requisite number of signatures) from appearing on the ballot. Since city council did not have this explicit power, organizers of the petition denounced the council's actions which they deemed to be illegal. A lawsuit was filed in federal court, and in April 2015 the city settled with the petition originators in the amount of $225,000.

=== St. Louis (2013) ===
In April 2013, the St. Louis Board of Aldermen voted 22–3 to allow police to cite individuals instead of arresting them for small amounts of cannabis. Cited persons would be processed in municipal court (instead of state court) and subject to a fine in the range of 100 to 500 dollars. The law went into effect in June 2013.

Penalties were further reduced in February 2018 when the Board of Aldermen voted 24–0 to set a $25 fine for possession of up to 35 grams (1 1/4 oz).

=== Kansas City (2017) ===
In April 2017, Kansas City residents approved with 75% of the vote a ballot measure to decriminalize up to 35 grams (1 1/4 oz) of cannabis. The measure eliminated the threat of jail time and reduced the penalty to a $25 fine. The penalty was later eliminated in July 2020 by a 9–4 city council vote.

=== St. Louis (2021) ===
In November 2021, the St. Louis Board of Aldermen voted 23–0 to allow the possession of up to two ounces of cannabis and the cultivation of six plants under city law. The bill also prevents "adverse employer actions based on a positive drug test" for city employees who are medical cannabis patients and prohibits police from using the sight or smell of cannabis as the sole basis for police to stop someone.

== Implementation of reforms ==
=== Medical ===
==== Medical licenses ====
After medical cannabis was legalized with Amendment 2, the scoring system used to award licenses was criticized. Some applicants received a score of zero for lengthy responses to questions, while others received different scores for similar answers. The state awarded the minimum number of licenses required by Amendment 2, causing many applicants to not get a license despite high scores. Many lawsuits were filed, with an unsuccessful challenge arguing the cap on licenses violated the right to farm in the state constitution. The FBI began an investigation into the awarding of licenses as part of a larger investigation into corruption around cannabis licenses in various states. Additionally, the state auditor launched an investigation into the awarding of licenses.

In response to lawsuits and investigations, the state awarded some additional licenses to applicants who were previously denied.

=== Recreational ===
==== Taxes ====
During the April 4, 2023 election, many counties and cities in Missouri approved the additional sales tax on recreational cannabis of 3%. It was initially unclear if city taxes and county taxes will stack. After many of the sales taxes went into effect that October, dispensaries sued to prevent stacking of city and county taxes. Amendment 3's drafters supported the position that taxes cannot stack, while the state's cannabis regulatory agency initially said the taxes could not stack before retracting their statement and offering no guidance. In May 2024, a Missouri district court ruled that cities and counties can both tax recreational cannabis.

After voters passed the 3% tax increase in St. Louis, the city missed an administrative deadline, causing lost revenues of around $500,000. St. Louis filed the paperwork to begin collecting the tax in January 2024.

==== 2023 Recall ====
In August 2023, the state recalled over 60,000 cannabis products (including vape cartridges, edibles, and prerolls) manufactured by Delta Extraction LLC. No adverse reactions were reported due to use of recalled products. The recall stems from use of hemp-derived THC produced from sources outside Missouri, causing uncertainty regarding testing of harmful chemicals. Delta Extraction sued the state, arguing they created the products safely and that the state's cannabis regulatory agency did not have the authority to regulate hemp-derived THC.

==== Microbusinesses ====
In addition to normal cannabis business licenses, Missouri has a category of licenses designed for disadvantaged communities. These communities include low-income, those who have previous cannabis arrests, and disabled veterans. Rather than being awarded by a scoring system similar to how medical licenses were first awarded, these microbusiness licenses are awarded by lottery. Licenses are for dispensaries and wholesale facilities, which are able to grow 250 flowering plants. The first 48 microbusiness licenses were awarded from a pool of over 1,000 applicants in October 2023, with further rounds in 2024 and 2025. Each round of licensing includes two dispensaries and four wholesale facilities per congressional district.

Critics of the microbusiness licenses argue that the licenses will further limit minority entrepreneurship. The awarding of licenses was also criticized as some awardees were representatives from out-of-state companies who used eligible people to apply on their behalf. Some companies were awarded multiple microbusiness licenses. In response to these allegations, the state revoked 11 of the 48 awarded licenses in December 2023. Reporting from the Missouri Independent describe cannabis businessman John Payne's involvement in Missouri's micro-business applications as possibly "predatory" in nature.
