= Healing Church in Rhode Island =

American religious movement

- Theology: Entheogenic use of cannabis
- Region: Rhode Island

The Healing Church in Rhode Island is a Rhode Island–based religious sect whose adherents believe that cannabis (or marijuana) is a "holy herb" and use it in religious rituals. Leaders of the group attracted attention in 2015 for attempting to smoke marijuana in front of the Roger Williams National Memorial (a memorial to Roger Williams, a pioneer of religious freedom and one of the smallest National Parks) as part of a religious service. One of the church members said that bhang was consumed during the service on federal property, to avoid violating a no-smoking rule. The following year, two leaders of the group were arrested and charged in connection with a marijuana grow operation. Days before the arrest, the pair had filed a lawsuit in federal district court, contending that enforcement of state anti-marijuana laws against those who use marijuana for religious purposes violates the U.S. Constitution.
