= Cannabis in the Northern Mariana Islands =

The recreational and medicinal use of cannabis in the Northern Mariana Islands has been legal since September 2018. House Bill 20-178 was signed into law by Gov. Ralph Torres, becoming Public Law 20-66. The cannabis legalization bill was introduced as the "Taulamwaar Sensible CNMI Cannabis Act of 2018," named in honor of David Kapileo Peter or Taulamwaar, who advocated cannabis legalization over four years ago. The first dispensary opened to the public on July 16, 2021.

According to the 2012 World Drug Report by the United Nations Office of Drugs and Crime, the Commonwealth of Northern Mariana Islands (CNMI), a United States Territory, then had the second highest marijuana consumption per capita of any nation or territory in the world, at 22.2%.

== Drug Threat Assessment ==
The October 2003 National Drug Intelligence Center's Northern Mariana Islands Drug Threat Assessment stated in part that:

Marijuana is readily available and widely abused in the CNMI; however, it is difficult to quantify the extent of marijuana abuse due to the lack of drug abuse statistics and marijuana-related survey data for the CNMI.

From 2000 to 2001 law enforcement eradication efforts caused a decrease in local cannabis cultivation, and distributors had to obtain most of their marijuana from sources outside the commonwealth. As a result, prices increased dramatically. A joint (0.5 gram), also known as a stick, of marijuana sold for an average price of $2.50 from 1997 to 1999 when supplies of locally produced marijuana were plentiful. The price of a joint subsequently increased to $20 to $50. In addition, sandwich bags (nickel and dime bags) of marijuana have been replaced by 1-inch-square, resealable bags containing small quantities of marijuana that sell for $20 to $35 each. Tourists typically are charged higher prices for retail quantities of marijuana than are local residents. At the wholesale level in Saipan, marijuana sells for approximately $1,500 per pound.

As a result of strong eradication efforts by law enforcement, cannabis cultivation in the CNMI is primarily limited to small quantities intended for personal use. CNMI authorities now focus on undercover operations, controlled purchases, and border interdiction.

According to the Department of Public Safety Criminal Investigation Bureau, marijuana is transported to the CNMI by criminal groups that cultivate cannabis in the Philippines and the neighboring island of the Republic of Palau. Filipino criminal groups typically transport marijuana in cargo containers aboard commercial maritime vessels. Criminal groups from Palau generally pay couriers to transport marijuana concealed on their bodies or packed in coolers. Local cultivators in the CNMI also transport small quantities of marijuana from island to island.

== Legalization ==
=== 2010 legalization attempt ===
In 2010, the CNMI House of Representatives approved a legalization bill to regulate and tax marijuana, but the measure ultimately failed.

=== 2018 legalization act ===
The CNMI Cannabis Act of 2018 was introduced to the Commonwealth Legislature in 2017, and was passed by the Senate in May, 2018. On August 8, 2018, lawmakers voted to approve the legalization of cannabis by a margin of 18 to 1, making it the first jurisdiction in the United States to go from direct prohibition to legalization. The bill was signed by the Governor on September 21, 2018.
