= Stavros Mendros =

American politician

Stavros Mendros is an American politician and consultant from Maine. He represented Lewiston in the Maine House of Representatives from 1998 to 2002.
