= Cannabis in the United States Virgin Islands =

Cannabis in the United States Virgin Islands is legal for recreational use since January 18, 2023, under territorial law. Legislation to legalize was passed by the territorial legislature in 2022, and was signed into law on January 18. Medical use was legalized in 2019 through a bill that passed the Senate 9–4. It remains illegal under federal law.

== Decriminalization (2014) ==
In December 2014, USVI's unicameral Legislature voted 14–0 to override Governor John P. DeJongh's line-item veto of cannabis decriminalization from the territory's 2015 budget. Penalties for possession of one ounce (28 g) of cannabis or less were reduced from a year in jail and $5,000 fine to a civil offense punishable by a fine of $100–$200. Governor DeJongh had vetoed the measure in October, saying the bill would complicate the government's ability to deal with cannabis regarding workplace safety rules and pre-trial release and bail.

== Medical cannabis referendum (2014) ==
In 2014 a non-binding referendum was held in USVI, asking voters whether the Legislature should explore the issue of legalizing medical cannabis. In August the USVI Senate approved the addition of that referendum to the 2014 election, 12–2. In November, the results were announced as coming in favor of the consideration of medical cannabis, 56%–43% (10,503–8,074). It followed a 2012 referendum that approved the legalisation of industrial hemp.

== Medical cannabis legalized (2019) ==
On January 19, 2019, Gov. Albert Bryan signed into law the Virgin Islands Medical Cannabis Patient Care Act. The act allows patients with a doctor's recommendation to use and possess up to 4 ounces (110 g) of cannabis for treatment of certain qualifying medical conditions. A system for licensing of cultivators and dispensaries is also outlined, as well as a provision for patients to cultivate up to 12 plants. The act passed the Senate by a 9–4 vote.

== Adult-use cannabis legislation (2019) ==
On December 3, 2019, Gov. Albert Bryan announced a recreational cannabis amendment to the Virgin Islands Medical Cannabis Patient Care Act. The amendment would allow anyone to obtain a license to purchase cannabis from a licensed dispensary. Expungement of non-violent marijuana convictions is included in the amendment.

== Adult-use cannabis legislation (2022) ==
Senate Bill 34-0345 "to expand the legalization of Cannabis from medicinal use to include Adult Use Cannabis" was introduced by Senators Janelle K. Sarauw and Angel Bolques Jr. in November 2022. The bill was passed by a veto-proof Senate majority on December 30, 2022. The governor signed it into law on January 18.
