= 2016 Maine Question 1 =

Citizen-initiated referendum to legalize marijuana

Question 1: Citizen Initiative
- An Act To Legalize Marijuana

Results
Choice	Votes	%
Yes	381,768	50.26%
No	377,773	49.74%
Valid votes	759,541	98.43%
Invalid or blank votes	12,120	1.57%
Total votes	771,661	100.00%
- County results Yes 50–60% No 60–70% 50–60%

Maine Question 1, formally An Act to Legalize Marijuana, is a citizen-initiated referendum question that qualified for the Maine November 8, 2016 statewide ballot. It was qualified for the ballot after a Maine Superior Court judge ordered that petitions rejected by the Maine Secretary of State be reconsidered. The proposal sought to legalize the recreational use of marijuana in Maine for those over the age of 21, and institute a 10 percent tax on its sale. As the Maine Legislature and Governor Paul LePage declined to enact the proposal as written, it appeared on the ballot along with elections for President of the United States, Maine's two U.S. House seats, the Legislature, other statewide ballot questions, and various local elections.

According to uncertified results, the referendum passed by 50.3% to 49.7%, a margin of under 5,000 votes. On November 10, two days after the election, the Associated Press called the result in favor of the "Yes" vote. However, opponents of the measure requested a recount and then withdrew their request on December 17.

After the partially completed recount, the results were certified as 381,768 in favor and 377,773 opposed. As of 2024, Question 1's results remain the narrowest margin of victory for any successful marijuana legalization measure in U.S. history.

== Background ==
The passage of ballot measures in Colorado and Washington in 2012 which legalize marijuana has led to efforts across the United States to do so. The use of marijuana for medical purposes has been legal in Maine since 1999. Attempts by the Maine Legislature to legalize recreational marijuana have not succeeded, including one effort to put the question directly onto the ballot. Some success in legalization has been seen at the local level, with Portland legalizing recreational use in 2013 by a wide margin. It has also been legalized in South Portland but a legalization effort in Lewiston failed.

Petitions for two separate groups to collect signatures to place a ballot measure on the 2016 ballot were issued by the Maine Secretary of State's Office, one on April 28, 2015 to a group called Legalize Maine, and another on June 3, 2016 to the Campaign to Regulate Marijuana Like Alcohol, which is affiliated with the Marijuana Policy Project. The two proposals were similar but Legalize Maine's was more permissible, legalizing up to 2.5 oz. for use by those 21 and older, as opposed to only 1 oz. under the MPP's proposal. It also called for a 10 percent tax on marijuana. Legalize Maine promoted their proposal as "home grown". The two groups agreed to combine their efforts on October 26, 2015 and coalesce behind Legalize Maine's proposal, so that there would only be one legalization effort. An effort by State Rep. Mark Dion (D-Portland) to pass a bill legalizing marijuana failed on June 22, 2015, largely because legislators did not want to undercut the petition gathering effort. Dion had felt that the Legislature should get out in front on this issue to avoid having to fix a poorly written referendum proposal later.

Supporters of legalization turned in 99,929 signatures to Secretary of State Matthew Dunlap on February 1, 2016. A small group protested those delivering the signatures outside the Secretary's Office, objecting to out of state groups being involved in the legalization effort.

=== Status of petitions ===
Dunlap announced on March 2, 2016 that the petition gathering effort had failed and the issue did not qualify for the ballot. He stated that his office could only validate 51,543 signatures, well below the 61,123 required to get to the ballot. 13,525 signatures were rejected as not belonging to registered Maine voters, and a smaller number was rejected for various other errors. The largest number of signatures rejected, 31,338, was due to signatures of a notary public and petition circulators who signed the oaths on the petitions not matching those on file with the Secretary of State's Office. Dunlap stated that "We’re not saying any malfeasance was or wasn’t done, that’s not up to us to determine. Our goal isn’t to invalidate signatures. The goal is to make sure they are valid." Supporters immediately announced that they would appeal the decision to Maine Superior Court, stating that "we sincerely hope that 17,000-plus Maine citizens will not be disenfranchised due to a handwriting technicality."

One of the notaries in question, Stavros Mendros, publicly stated that he had signed the petitions but that given the sheer volume of papers he had to sign in a short amount of time, which he claimed was almost 15,000 papers, it would be almost impossible for him to write his signature exactly the same each time. The Portland Press Herald obtained copies of petitions and sent them to independent handwriting experts who stated that in their opinion the signatures were all within natural variations in handwriting and were likely from the same person. Supporters also criticized Dunlap's office for not using handwriting experts or discussing their concerns with supporters to validate the signatures.

Judge Michaela Murphy ruled on April 8, 2016 that the rejected petitions should be reinstated for consideration. In her opinion, Murphy stated that Dunlap had committed an error of law by applying an "overly burdensome" interpretation of the law. Murphy explained that signatures gathering and oath administration are often done under less than ideal conditions and that requiring perfect signature reproduction on each form signed was unreasonable. Dunlap announced on April 13 that he had declined to appeal the decision and would begin re-reviewing the previously rejected petitions.

Dunlap announced on April 27 that about 11,000 previously invalidated signatures were found to be valid, which meant that the referendum qualified for the ballot. The proposal went to the Legislature for consideration, but they declined to approve it and sent it to the ballot. The question will appear on the ballot as "Do you want to allow the possession and use of marijuana under state law by persons who are at least 21 years of age, and allow the cultivation, manufacture, distribution, testing, and sale of marijuana and marijuana products subject to state regulation, taxation and local ordinance?"

== Campaign ==
Maine Attorney General Janet Mills expressed concern that the law as written would legalize marijuana use for all ages, calling the language of the bill "troublesome".

=== Notable endorsements ===
==== Supporters ====
- ACLU of Maine
- Marijuana Policy Project
- Eric Brakey, Republican State Senator
- Mark Dion, State Representative (D-Portland), former Cumberland County Sheriff
- David Miramant, Democratic State Senator
- Diane Russell, State Representative (D-Portland)
- Ryan Fecteau, State Representative (D-Biddeford)
- Brian Hubbell, State Representative (D-Bar Harbor)
- Larry Dunphy, State Representative (I-Embden)
- Matt Moonen, State Representative (D-Portland)
- Deane Rykerson, State Representative (D-Kittery)
- Scott Hamman, State Representative (D-South Portland)
- Peter Stucky, State Representative (D-Portland)
- MaineToday Media newspapers; Portland Press Herald, Kennebec Journal, Morning Sentinel

==== Opponents ====
- American Automobile Association
- Paul LePage, Governor of Maine
- Walt Whitcomb, Commissioner of the Maine Department of Agriculture
- Smart Approaches to Marijuana
- Maine Public Health Association
- Maine Hospital Association
- Maine Medical Association
- Maine Association of School Nurses
- Maine State Chamber of Commerce
- Alliance for Addiction and Mental Health Services, Maine
- National Alliance on Mental Illness Maine
- Maine Chiefs of Police Association
- Bangor Region Chamber of Commerce
- Maine State Police
- Aroostook Substance Abuse Prevention
- Cumberland County Sheriffs Office
- Yarmouth Police Department
- Cumberland Police Department
- Concerned Women for America of Maine
- Falmouth Police Department
- Christian Civic League of Maine
- Dixfield Police Department
- Bangor Daily News
- Ellsworth American

== Public opinion ==
Public opinion on the legalization of recreational marijuana in Maine
Poll source	Date(s) administered	Sample size	Margin of error	% support	% opposition	% Undecided/Don't Know
Portland Press Herald/UNH Survey Center	October 20–25, 2016	663 LV	± 3.8%	50%	41%	9%
Portland Press Herald/UNH Survey Center	September 15–20, 2016	505 LV	± 4.3%	53%	38%	9%
Maine People's Resource Center	March 5–8, 2016	557 LV	± 4.15%	54%	42%	4%
Critical Insights	March 4–10, 2016	610 AV	N/A	55%	41%	4%

== Recount ==
On 5 December 2016 the state of Maine called for an official recount of the ballots regarding Question 1, a process expected to take a month or more and cost up to $500,000. The International Business Times reported that governor Paul LePage said:

... he would be taking up the issue with president-elect Donald Trump to find out if the incoming administration would enforce federal laws prohibiting legal marijuana use. However, if Trump decides to keep cannabis laws at the state level, LePage said he would accept the law.

By December 16, around 30% of all ballots cast had been recounted, including those from Maine's largest city of Portland without any notable change in the results. The recount was ordered suspended until after January 1, and the No on 1 campaign filled out the requisite paperwork to formally cancel the recount one day later.

== Results ==
=== Election night ===
Question 1 Election Night Results
Choice	Votes	%
For	381,692	50.27
Against	377,619	49.73
Total	759,311	100.00
Registered voters/turnout		71.74

=== After recount ===
Question 1 Results after Partial Recount
County	Yes	Votes	No	Votes
Androscoggin	48.37%	27,374	51.63%	29,217
Aroostook	36.72%	13,015	63.28%	22,433
Cumberland	55.21%	96,146	44.79%	78,014
Franklin	50.46%	8,523	49.54%	8,366
Hancock	50.59%	16,476	49.41%	16,090
Kennebec	46.45%	31,186	53.55%	35,960
Knox	51.88%	12,162	48.12%	11,281
Lincoln	49.68%	10,870	50.32%	11,009
Oxford	50.21%	16,028	49.79%	15,897
Penobscot	45.64%	37,330	54.36%	44,466
Piscataquis	44.26%	4,150	55.74%	5,226
Sagadahoc	52.82%	11,660	47.18%	10,413
Somerset	45.80%	12,120	54.20%	14,345
Waldo	48.35%	11,129	51.65%	11,889
Washington	47.80%	8,003	52.20%	8,739
York	54.04%	62,824	45.96%	53,438
UOCAVA	73.68%	2,772	26.32%	990
Total	50.26%	381,768	49.74%	377,773

== See also ==
- Cannabis in the United States
- Colorado Amendment 64
- Washington Initiative 502
