= Cannabis in Guam =

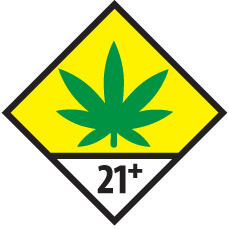
Guam's Cannabis Universal Symbol

Cannabis in Guam has been legal for medical use since 2015 and legal for recreational use since April 2019. Guam was the first United States Territory to legalize medical marijuana, passing via a ballot referendum in 2014.

The 2012 UNODC World Drug Report ranked Guam as the third-highest jurisdiction for adult cannabis use in the world at 18.4%. As of 2017, NORML reported that possession of less than an ounce outside a school zone could result in a civil infraction with a $100 fine.

== History ==
A 1996 report by the Guam Health Planning and Development Agency attributes the origin of marijuana usage in Guam to the Vietnam War of the 1960s and 1970s, when American servicemen on the island popularized the habit.

== Guam v. Guerrero ==
Guam v. Guerrero was a United States Court of Appeals, Ninth Circuit ruling issued in 2002, which ruled that Benny Guerrero was not entitled to religious protections for his possession of cannabis on Guam despite his professed Rastafari religion. Guerrero was arrested for possession at Guam International Airport in 1991. His argument for religious exemption had been approved by a lower court, then by the Supreme Court of Guam which found it valid under the Free Exercise Clause of the Constitution of Guam; however, the Guamanian government raised the issue to the Ninth Circuit which ultimately struck down the lower findings.

== Medical marijuana ==
Guam legalized medical marijuana for "debilitative conditions" via referendum in the November 2014 mid-term elections, with 56% voting in favor.

Guam had previously attempted to legalize medical marijuana in 2010, under "Bill 420" (later withdrawn and replaced with Bill 423); its public hearing was attended by only one person, who spoke against the measure, and the bill was unsuccessful.

In 2017, Guam's governor vetoed legislation to allow medical cannabis license holders to cultivate cannabis in their homes.

== Legalization ==
In January 2017 governor Eddie Calvo proposed a bill, called the Marijuana Control Law, to legalize recreational cannabis in Guam. In January 2019, governor Lou Leon Guerrero addressed possible recreational legalization in Guam, noting "We need to put in the same kinds of rules and regulations in terms of regulating alcohol, tobacco, and other substances so it won’t get abused."

In March 2019, the Legislature of Guam passed a bill (by a very close vote of 8–7) to legalize cannabis and immediately sent it to the Governor's desk. On April 4, 2019, the Governor of Guam signed the bill allowing for full recreational legalization of cannabis.
