= Cannabis in Georgia (U.S. state) =

Cannabis in Georgia is illegal for recreational use, but decriminalized in the cities of Atlanta, Savannah, Macon, Athens, and others. Limited medical use was legalized in 2015 through low THC cannabis oil, and later legislation expanded the medical cannabis program in the state. The first licensed dispensaries opened in 2023.

== Illicit trade ==
In the 1970s and 1980s, a number of county sheriffs and deputies were prosecuted for their involvement in the drug trade, including Sheriff John David Davis, a former moonshiner who had been pardoned by President Nixon and was convicted in 1984 of smuggling cannabis into South Georgia. Davis' case parallels that of a number of other former moonshiners who segued into the cannabis trade.

=== 1983 paraquat spraying ===
In 1983, amidst controversy, the Drug Enforcement Administration conducted aerial spraying of illegal cannabis plots in the Chattahoochee National Forest in northern Georgia, using the herbicide paraquat. Citizens and a congressman objected, noting paraquat's dangers, and a temporary restraining order was placed on further spraying. The federal Drug Abuse Policy Officer Pat McKelvey rebutted that paraquat is a safe and widely used herbicide, and alleged that the objections to the DEA spraying had been raised by cannabis growers and legalization advocates.

== Legal reforms ==
=== 1980 medical cannabis legislation ===
In February 1980, a 50-0 Senate vote and a 156-8 House vote passed Mona Taft's bill supporting legal medical marijuana in Georgia for people diagnosed with glaucoma and cancer patients undergoing chemotherapy and radiation. Members from both parties came together to support Taft, including then-state Sen. Paul Broun. According to a Feb. 14, 1980, Knight-Ridder wire report about the bill, Broun hugged Taft when the legislation passed the Senate. The bill's sponsor, Rep. Virlyn Smith, R-Fairburn, even told the widow that he'd recently given a constituent taking chemotherapy a recipe for marijuana-laced chocolate-chip cookies. Georgia's program had effectively ended without ever supplying a single patient with the medical marijuana promised. Subsequent Georgia governors had the authority to reappoint the board but never acted. As a result, the law has lingered on the books for the last 30 years.

=== 2015–2026 medical legalization ===
A measure to allow medical cannabis oil up to 5% tetrahydrocannabinol (THC) passed the Georgia House in February 2015. On April 16, 2015, the low-THC cannabis oil (rich in cannabidiol, or CBD) was legalized for medical use in the state under HB 1, the Haleigh’s Hope Act. The bill was immediately enacted after being signed by Governor Nathan Deal. The bill allowed possession of the oil for eight qualifying medical conditions but did not provide for cultivation or distribution within the state. A May 2017 expansion under SB 16 added six more conditions. In 2018, HB 65 added intractable pain and posttraumatic stress disorder (PTSD). In April 2019 legislation was approved (House Bill 324) to allow in-state cultivation of cannabis and sale of the low-THC oil. In 2021, SB 195 was approved to allow the sale of cannabis tinctures, transdermal patches, lotions, and capsules, while still prohibiting edible products and flower. On April 28, 2023, the first licensed sales began with the opening of dispensaries in Marietta and Macon.

In 2026, the Georgia General Assembly passed Senate Bill 220, the ''Putting Georgia's Patients First Act'', which would further expand the state's medical cannabis program. The bill would rename "low THC oil" in state law as medical cannabis, remove the existing 5% THC cap, expand the list of qualifying conditions, and allow some patients to use medical cannabis through vaporization. The bill was signed into law by governor Brian Kemp on May 12, 2026.

=== Municipal level ===
These ordinances did not legalize marijuana under Georgia state law, but they reduced penalties for possession in some cities and local governments. In October 2017, Atlanta City Council voted 15–0 to reduce the penalty for up to 1 ounce (28 g) of cannabis to a $75 fine. Savannah City Council followed in March 2018 by voting 8–1 to reduce the penalty to a $150 fine. Other jurisdictions that have decriminalized or otherwise acted to reduce penalties include: Clarkston (2016), South Fulton (2018), Forest Park (2018), Kingsland (2018), Statesboro (2018), Macon–Bibb County (2019), Augusta (2019), Chamblee (2019), Tybee Island (2021), Athens–Clarke County (2022), Stonecrest (2022), and East Point (2023).

=== Enforcement and social impact ===
Cannabis policy in the state of Georgia has been discussed in relation to racial disparities in enforcement. According to the American Civil Liberties Union of Georgia, Black people in Georgia were three times more likely than white people to be arrested for marijuana possession, despite similar usage rates nationally. The ACLU of Georgia also reported that Georgia had more than 52,000 marijuana arrests in 2018, most of them for possession.
