= Legal history of cannabis in Canada =

The Cannabis Act (C-45) of June, 2018 paved the way for the legalization of cannabis in Canada on 17 October 2018. Police and prosecution services in all Canadian jurisdictions are currently capable of pursuing criminal charges for cannabis marketing without a licence issued by Health Canada. The Supreme Court of Canada has held that the federal Parliament has the power to criminalize the possession of cannabis and that doing so does not infringe upon the Canadian Charter of Rights and Freedoms. The Ontario Court of Appeal and the Superior Court of Ontario have, however, held that the absence of a statutory provision for medical marijuana is unconstitutional, and to that extent the federal law is of no force and effect if a prescription is obtained. The recreational use of cannabis has been legalized by the federal government, and took effect on 17 October 2018.

Since 1997, public opinion polls have found that an increasing majority of Canadians agree with the statement, "Smoking marijuana should not be a criminal offence". A June 2016 national poll conducted by Nanos Research showed that 7 in 10 Canadians were in favour of legalization.

Challenges to marijuana laws at the federal level did not result in the deletion of the appropriate sections from the Controlled Drugs and Substances Act. Legalization for personal (non-medical) consumption would need to be legislated, and that is the plan of the Government of Canada, as confirmed in 2015 and more specifically in 2016. The enactment of that legislation will be the concluding point in a long history of attempts to legalize cannabis through the courts.

In 2016, the Government of Canada was working on legislation to legalize cannabis. The final wording was still under discussion in late March 2017, but a probable date for the official effect of the legislation was widely publicized as 1 July 2018. The provinces will have the power to determine the method of distribution and sale as well as the legal age for cannabis use.

== History ==
=== Early drug prohibition ===
Drug prohibition in Canada began with the Opium Act of 1908, which was introduced based on a report by then-Deputy Minister of Labour, Mackenzie King. Following the Asiatic Exclusion League riot of 1907, King went to Vancouver to investigate causes of the riots and claims for compensation. Some of the claims came from opium manufacturers seeking compensation for damage done to their production facilities by the mob that attacked Chinatown and Japantown. While in Vancouver, King interviewed members of a Chinese anti-opium league and came away in favour of suppressing the drug because "opium smoking was making headway, not only among white men and boys, but also among women and girls." In his report, King summarized the progress of the anti-opium movement in China, the United States, Britain, and Japan to make the point that Canada was lagging behind in this international movement. King's recommendations were the basis for the 1908 Opium Act, which prohibited the sale, manufacture, and importation of opium for other than medicinal use. This was followed by the Opium and Drug Act of 1911, which outlawed the sale or possession of morphine, opium, or cocaine. Smoking opium became a separate offence, punishable by a maximum penalty of $50 ($1,374.17 in 2025) and one month in jail. King introduced the new legislation based on recommendations from the chief constable of the Vancouver police and to bring Canada's drug laws in line with resolutions passed at an American-led international anti-opium conference in Shanghai. The name of the 1911 Act is significant because it separates opium, associated with Chinese users, from "white drugs," so labelled because of the colour of both the drugs themselves and the race of those presumed to be consuming them.

The next wave of legislation began with the Opium and Narcotic Drug Act of 1920, which was amended in 1921 and again in 1922 before being consolidated in 1923. Penalties became stiffer in the 1920s, with far more prison terms being handed out compared with the earlier period when fines were typically given. Maximum prison sentences also increased from one to seven years and in 1922, possession and trafficking became a deportable offence. The catalyst for these laws also differed from the earlier ones in that they were largely the result of the agitation of moral reformers, particularly those in Vancouver who had stirred up a full-blown moral panic over the drug issue in the early 1920s. Race remained a persistent theme, and the drug prohibition movement was closely related to the move to totally exclude Chinese immigrants from Canada, which led to the 1923 Chinese Exclusion Act.

=== Cannabis prohibition ===
Cannabis was added to the Confidential Restricted List in 1923 under the Narcotics Drug Act Amendment Bill after a vague reference to a "new drug" during a late-night session of the House of Commons on 23 April 1923. More specifically, the government introduced the Act to Prohibit the Improper Use of Opium and other Drugs; this was a consolidation of other legislation but now listed three new drugs, including marijuana.

Historians often point to the 1782 publication of Emily Murphy's The Black Candle (which was reprinted in 1973) as the inspiration for the addition of the three extra drugs. Murphy was a suffragist and police magistrate who wrote a series of articles in Maclean's magazine under the pen-name "Janey Canuck", which formed the basis of her book. She used numerous anecdotes culled mostly from anti-drug reformers and police to make her arguments, which make strong links between drugs and race and the threat this poses to white women. She claimed that a ring of immigrants from other countries, particularly China, would corrupt the white race. "It is hardly credible that the average Chinese peddler has any definite idea in his mind of bringing about the downfall of the white race, his swaying motive being probably that of greed, but in the hands of his superiors, he may become a powerful instrument to that end."

Although Murphy's anti-drug writings were widely read and helped spread the drug panic across the country, historian Catharine Carstairs disputes that the seven-page chapter Marahuana—a new menace in Murphy's book inspired the inclusion of cannabis on Canada's restricted substance list. Specifically, Murphy was not respected by the Division of Narcotic Control because of the creative liberties she took in presenting research they had assisted her with. According to Carstairs, "There were insinuations in the records that the bureaucrats at the division of narcotic control did not think very highly of Emily Murphy and did not pay attention to what she was writing about, and they didn't consider her a particularly accurate or valuable source."

More likely, cannabis was added to the list because of Canadian involvement in international conferences where it was discussed. According to one government official, cannabis was outlawed after the Director of the Federal Division of Narcotic Control returned from League of Nations meetings where the international control of the drug was broached. Cannabis did not begin to attract official attention in Canada until the latter 1930s. The first seizure of cannabis by Canadian police was not until 1937. Between 1946 and 1961, cannabis accounted for 2% of all drug arrests in Canada.

=== Popularization ===
World map of annual cannabis prevalence

While recreational use of cannabis in the Western hemisphere had been growing since the 1800s, it remained almost unheard of in Canada until the 1930s, and it was not until the 1960s that cannabis surged in popularity as a drug. Initially in the 1960s the drug was popular among middle-class college students, only later expanding to other demographics. The maximum penalty for possession of small quantities was six months in prison and a $1,000 fine for a first offence. Convictions for cannabis skyrocketed, from 25 convictions between 1930 and 1946, to 20 cases in 1962, to 2,300 cases in 1968, to 12,000 in 1972. The Narcotics Control Act of 1961 increased maximum penalties to 14 years to life imprisonment.

According to a report titled For The Senate Special Committee On Illegal Drugs, the increase in marijuana use during the 1960s was due to the "hippie psychedelic ethos", a counter culture that rejected traditional values, the growth of underground newspapers, and the increased discussion about the drug in the mass media. The report also suggests that increased travel to parts of the world such as the Far East, where hashish was readily available at moderate cost, contributed to the popularity of the drug culture.

In response to the increased popularization of marijuana and the increase in criminal charges against middle class citizens, the government formed the Royal Commission of Inquiry in the Non-Medical Use of Drugs, usually referred to as the Le Dain Commission in 1969 to investigate the non-medical cannabis use in Canada. The commission's 1972 report recommended removing criminal penalties for cannabis possession, though not legalization, per se. While the subsequent two federal governments discussed the recommendation, no steps were actually taken to change legislation.

During the 1980s, Gallup polls indicated that cannabis use was stabilizing; this may have been because of the penalties and the changing opinion of the public toward a less permissive attitude that objected more strenuously to the marijuana-based lifestyle. However, cannabis use increased significantly during the 1990s. For example, statistics for Ontario between 1996 and 2000 indicated that use among 18-29 year olds increased from 18% to 28%.

An October 2016 national poll by Forum suggests that about five million adult Canadians now use cannabis at least once a month; this was expected to increase by 19 percent after marijuana is legalized. Canaccord Genuity analysts Matt Bottomley and Neil Maruoka released a research note with a more moderate estimates as to the number of users. They predicted that approximately 3.8 million persons will be recreational users (presumably on a frequent basis) by 2021.

With the confirmation of adult-use legalization in Canada's launch in October 2017, several celebrities have agreed to promote specific brands. Tweed Inc. will be producing and distributing Snoop Dogg's Leafs by Snoop cannabis brand, and Kevin Smith and Jason Mewes known as Jay and Silent Bob will be promoting Beleave Inc. Stars from the popular Canadian show Trailer Park Boys are launching the brand Trailer Park Buds, produced in collaboration with Organigram.

== Industrial hemp ==
Cannabis cultivation was banned in Canada in 1938, under the Opium and Narcotic Drug Act. Commercial cultivation and production of industrial hemp was legalized in Canada in 1998. Prior to that point only a limited number of experimental growers had been licensed under Health Canada, beginning in 1961.

== Developments since 2001 ==
=== Medical cannabis legislation ===
The regulation on access to cannabis for medical purposes, established by Health Canada in July 2001, defines two categories of patients eligible for access to medical cannabis. BC College of Physicians and Surgeons' recommendation, as well as the CMPA position, is that physicians may prescribe cannabis if they feel comfortable with it. The MMPR (Marijuana for Medical Purposes Regulations) forms are a confidential document between Health Canada, the physician and the patient. The information is not shared with the college or with the RCMP. No doctor has ever gone to court or faced prosecution for filling out a form or for prescribing medical cannabis. Category 1 covers any symptoms treated within the context of providing compassionate end-of-life care or at least one of the symptoms associated with medical conditions listed below:

- Severe pain or persistent muscle spasms from multiple sclerosis, from a spinal cord injury, from spinal cord disease
- Severe pain, cachexia, anorexia, weight loss or severe nausea from cancer or HIV/AIDS infection
- Severe pain from severe forms of arthritis
- Seizures from epilepsy

Category 2 is for applicants who have debilitating symptoms of medical conditions other than those described in Category 1. The application of eligible patients must be supported by a medical practitioner. Health Canada permits cannabis for approved patients who can demonstrate a medical need for compassionate end-of-life care or debilitating symptoms. Chris Buors, a cannabis activist, was sentenced to six months in jail in November 2004 after pleading guilty to cannabis distribution and marketing charges arising from his operation of the Manitoba Compassion Club which served patients who had a variety of illnesses.

In a survey conducted by the United Nations in 2011 it was revealed that 12.6% of the population, roughly 4.39 million adults, have used cannabis at least once in the past year, while the estimate for those aged between 15 and 24 was 26.3%. Considering the massive size of the cannabis market, it is clear that prohibition has harmed the Canadian government greatly, like others worldwide, from an expansive additional source of revenue at a time when cuts in benefits and investments are being used to balance the budget and come out of debt. However, the loss of tax revenues is not the only problem associated with the current cannabis use policies: prohibition has kept the drug industry illegal and, subsequently, deregulated. This makes for risk-premiums that create a monopolized market with high barriers to entry, which in turn, leads to increases in violence, organized crime and the diversion of limited government resources to prosecuting drug users (i.e. non-violent crimes).

In April 2014, the Medical Marijuana Access Program was replaced by the Marijuana for Medical Purposes Regulations (or MMPR) by Health Canada. Under the MMPR, legal medical cannabis production is authorized to licensed producers whom Health Canada maintains a public database of. Patients wishing to fulfill a medical cannabis prescription must register with and order from a licensed producer of their choice. To receive prescription for medical cannabis, a patient must obtain a medical document from a healthcare practitioner and obtain Authorization to Possess from Health Canada. Individuals with an Authorization to Possess valid on 21 March 2014 fall under a grandfather clause and may hold a maximum quantity of dried herbal cannabis as specified by their Authorization to Possess or 150 grams, whichever is less.

In June 2015, the Supreme Court of Canada expanded the definition of medical cannabis to include any form of the drug, including but not limited to brownies, teas, or oils.

While marijuana is legal for medical use, Toronto Police executed Project Claudia in 2016, seizing 279 kg of marijuana from multiple dispensaries regardless of their adherence to the Marihuana for Medical Purposes Regulations. 186 charges were laid, many related to the sale of food. The interrupted service prompted medical marijuana patients to protest at TPS headquarters.

=== Cannabis refugees in Canada ===
There are cases of users of medical cannabis in the United States who, on being persecuted in their own country, have fled across the border to Canada as "cannabis refugees", where they have sought asylum under the United Nations refugee convention. This began occurring in the early part of the 2000s when the U.S. Attorney General, John Ashcroft, ordered a clampdown on the use of medical cannabis in the United States. Some of those who have fled are wanted by the U.S. federal government on charges related to their use of cannabis.

=== Failed decriminalization bills (2003, 2004) ===
On 27 May 2003, the Liberal government of Jean Chrétien introduced a bill that would have decriminalized the possession for personal use of small amounts of cannabis. Possession of 15 grams or less would have been punishable only with a fine, and those possessing between 15 and 30 grams would be either ticketed or arrested for criminal charges at the officer's discretion. Personal cultivation of up to seven plants would have also become a summary offence, while the punishment for cultivation in larger amounts would have been more severe. The bill looked likely to pass into law, but it died when Parliament prorogued. The bill's death was largely due to pressure from the American government's Drug Enforcement Administration, which had threatened to slow down border-crossings along the Canada–United States border with increased searches for cannabis.

An identical bill was introduced in November 2004 by the minority Liberal government of Paul Martin. It did not become law when Martin's government was defeated in a confidence vote. After the Conservative minority victory in the 2006 election, the new government did not continue with this legislation, nor did a private member's bill put forward new legislation on this topic.

=== The Vancouver plan (2005) ===
This is a draft by the city authorities in Vancouver called Preventing Harm from Psychoactive Drug Use dated November 2005, that aims to regulate the sale of cannabis. The principle is "when A Framework for Action: A Four Pillar Approach to Drug Problems in Vancouver was adopted by City Council in 2001, Vancouver committed to developing a comprehensive strategy based on the best evidence available to address harmful drug use in the city. In public meetings across the city, citizens called for a more focused, coordinated and sustained approach to addressing drug related issues. Since that time, our understanding of the issue has grown. This plan highlights both the complexity and centrality of prevention in any discussion of a comprehensive Four Pillar approach to harmful drug use." A Four Pillar Approach to Drug Problems that was founded by Donald Macpherson consists of the equal involvement of facilities that deal with Prevention, Treatment, Enforcement and Harm Reduction strategies in a commonly shared goal to manage the negative impacts of severe drug use and dependence on the community and the individual.

=== Marc Emery extradition and trial (2005–2009) ===
Marc Emery, a cannabis activist and former cannabis seed distributor from Vancouver, was extradited to the United States, where he was sentenced to 5 years in prison for "distribution of marijuana" seeds. Though accused of laundering seed money from 1998 until his arrest in 2005, Emery paid provincial and federal taxes as a "marijuana seed vendor" totalling nearly $600,000.

=== Anti-drug strategy (2007) ===
In October 2007, while in his first term in office, Prime Minister Stephen Harper announced a new national anti-drug strategy. Following the Conservative victory in the 2008 election, the government reannounced the policy in February 2009. The proposed legislation would have dealers facing one-year mandatory prison sentences if they are operating for organized crime purposes, or if violence is involved. Dealers would also face a two-year mandatory jail sentence if they are selling to youth, or dealing drugs near a school or an area normally frequented by youth. Additionally, people in Canada who run a large cannabis grow operation of at least 500 plants would risk facing a mandatory two-year jail term. Maximum penalties for producing cannabis would increase from 7 to 14 years.

=== Bill C-15/S-10: mandatory minimums for cannabis (2009) ===
Legislation submitted by the Conservative minority government moved in a new direction on cannabis towards increasing penalties on cannabis trafficking by introducing mandatory minimum sentencing.

The Senate sent the bill back to the house. Parliament was prorogued at the end of 2009 so the bill died, but it was reintroduced as Bill S-10. Bill S-10 did not become law, in March 2011 as parliament was dissolved after a non-confidence vote.

=== Legalization (2017–2018) ===
On 13 April 2017, a bill to legalize cannabis by 1 July 2018 was introduced to Parliament. It would allow for national use by individuals 18 and over, and possession of 30 grams. Provinces could further restrict possession, sale and use. Provisions were not made for legal sales.

=== Final legalization ===
On 1 June 2018, the Canadian Senate passed an amendment to C-45 outlawing cannabis "brand-stretching". The amendment, which passed 34–28, outlaws the sale and display of cannabis-related merchandise and makes it difficult to publicly promote cannabis once legalized. However, this amendment was rejected by the Liberal government when the bill was returned to the House of Commons and does not appear in the final version of C-45 that received Royal Assent.

After being passed by the House of Commons, the bill was sent to the Senate. On 19 June 2018, the Senate passed the bill and the Prime Minister announced the effective legalization date as 17 October 2018. Canada is the second nation (after Uruguay) to legalize the drug.

As expected, the use of cannabis for recreational purposes became legal across the country on that date, under the Cannabis Act. Persons aged 18 or older can possess up to 30 grams of dried or "equivalent non-dried form" in public. Adults are also allowed to make cannabis-infused food and drinks "as long as organic solvents are not used to create concentrated products." Each household is allowed to grow up to four cannabis plants from "licensed seed or seedlings", although Quebec and Manitoba chose to be excluded from this aspect of the legislation. Each province set its own procedures for retail sales, and these vary greatly, as discussed in a later section, but all include an option for on-line sales.

The first Legal Recreational Cannabis in Canada was purchased by 46-year-old Ian Power.

Since marijuana is illegal in the US per federal legislation, the government warned that "previous use of cannabis, or any substance prohibited by U.S. federal laws, could mean that you are denied entry to the U.S". Canadians travelling within the country (but not internationally) are allowed to carry up to 30 grams of cannabis. Naturally, driving under the influence of drugs remained illegal.

== Key court decisions ==
All of these decisions have invalidated the prohibition of cannabis based on the insufficiency of the exemptions provided for legitimate medical users of the drug. However, the laws have been and will probably continue to be modified in order to adapt them to constitutional requirements. As such, there is the possibility that a judge will uphold as valid a newer revision of the law. This also does not stop prosecutors from pursuing charges against cannabis users. Therefore, cannabis users cannot be assured that they will not be prosecuted for their use of the drug.

=== 2000: R. v. Parker (Ontario Court of Appeal) ===
R. v. Parker was the landmark decision that first invalidated the cannabis prohibition. However the declaration of invalidity was suspended for one year. It concerned the case of an epileptic who could only alleviate his suffering by recourse to cannabis. The Court found that the prohibition on cannabis was unconstitutional as it did not contain any exemption for medical use.

=== 2003: R. v. J.P. (Ontario Court of Appeal) ===
On 16 May 2003, the Ontario Superior Court found the accused party, "J.P.", not guilty. The appellate court ruled that the Medical Marihuana program's rules do not form a basis for the prosecution of J.P., as they do not themselves contain any effective prohibitions.

The Crown appealed the decision of the Ontario Superior Court to the Ontario Court of Appeal. But in October 2003, the Court of Appeal upheld the invalidity of section four of the Controlled Drugs and Substances Act as it applies to cannabis, on the same grounds as those given by the lower court. The court stated in its ruling:

As we have held, the MMAR [Medical Marihuana Access Regulations] did not create a constitutionally acceptable medical exemption. In Parker, this court made it clear that the criminal prohibition against possession of marihuana, absent a constitutionally acceptable medical exemption, was of no force and effect. As of April 12, 2002, there was no constitutionally acceptable medical exemption. It follows that as of that date the offence of possession of marihuana in s. 4 of the CDSA was of no force and effect. The respondent could not be prosecuted.

=== 2003: R v Malmo‑Levine; R v Caine (Supreme Court of Canada) ===
In late 2003, in R v Malmo-Levine; R v Caine, the Supreme Court of Canada dismissed a general constitutional challenge to Canada's criminalization of marijuana possession, brought under the Constitution Act, 1867 and under the Canadian Charter of Rights and Freedoms. One of the appellants had been convicted in the lower courts of simple possession of marihuana, while the other had been convicted of possession for the purposes of trafficking. If they had succeeded in their challenge, the cannabis law would have been struck down entirely, unlike the more limited challenges based on the medical use of marihuana.

The appellants argued that the federal Parliament lacked the authority to criminalize marihuana possession. They also challenged the offence under three sections of the Charter: s. 7 (liberty and principles of fundamental justice), s. 12 (cruel and unusual treatment and punishment) and s. 15 (equality).

On the first point, they argued that the criminalization of marihuana did not come within the federal criminal law jurisdiction. With respect to s. 7 of the Charter, they argued that the right to liberty and the principles of fundamental justice protected by s. 7 included a "harm principle": that the federal criminal law power can only be used to criminalize harmful conduct. With respect to s. 12, they argued that the punishment for possession was grossly disproportionate. On s. 15, they argued that singling out marihuana possession infringed the equality guarantee of the Charter.

The Supreme Court dismissed their appeals. On the issue of the criminal law power, the Court unanimously concluded that the federal criminal law power included the power to criminalize marihuana.

The Court split, 6–3, on the Charter issues. Speaking for the majority, Justices Gonthier and Binnie found no infringement of any of the Charter provisions. On s. 7, the majority found that the proposed "harm principle" did not qualify as a principle of fundamental justice, and in any event the government had provided sufficient evidence of harm to justify its actions. Nor was the law arbitrary. On the issue of punishment, the fact that there was no minimum sentence for the offences indicated that the law was not grossly disproportionate. On the equality issue, the lifestyle goals of the accused did not rise to the level of inherent personal characteristics to trigger s. 15 of the Charter.

The three dissenting judges each wrote their own reasons. All three agreed that the federal criminal law power included the power to criminalize marihuana. Justice Arbour accepted the appellants' argument that the principles of fundamental justice included a "harm principle". She concluded that the criminalization of marihuana failed to meet that requirement, and so was unconstitutional. Justices Le Bel and Deschamps did not accept the "harm principle" as a principle of fundamental justice, but they both concluded that the law was arbitrary and therefore infringed the principles of fundamental justice.

=== 2007: R. v. Long (Ontario Court of Justice) ===
The Ontario Court of Justice held in R. v. Long that the prohibition in the Controlled Drugs and Substance Act against the possession of cannabis were unconstitutional in the absence of an accompanying constitutionally acceptable exemption for medical cannabis. The current exemption depended on the government supplying cannabis, which it was only doing as a result of the policy. However, the policy did not impose a legal obligation upon the government to supply cannabis to those who needed it for medical purposes. The court held that without such an obligation, the exemption was constitutionally unacceptable, as access to marijuana depended on the implementation of a policy rather than the application of a law. If the government wanted to control the supply of cannabis, it had to impose an obligation upon itself to supply marijuana to eligible persons. The court held that if the government was obliged by law to supply cannabis in accordance with the policy, the exemption would be constitutionally acceptable.

A notice of appeal was filed by the Crown on 23 August 2007 and the verdict was overturned by Superior Court judge in 2008. The case was sent back to Ontario Court of Justice for retrial.

=== 2007: R. v. Bodnar/Hall/Spasic (Ontario Court of Justice) ===
In R. v. Bodnar/Hall/Spasic, the Ontario Court of Justice followed the Long decision, holding that the prohibition against possession of cannabis in the Controlled Drugs and Substances Act is invalid and of no force or effect. Hon. Justice Edmonson stated in his ruling that "there is no offence known to law that the accused have committed."

=== 2008: Sfetkopoulos v. Canada (Federal Court of Canada) ===
As of 10 January 2008, Justice Barry Strayer of the Federal Court of Canada struck down the federal regulations concerning the growing of medical cannabis by licensed producers. Prior to the case, a producer was prohibited from growing for more than one person. The Marijuana Medical Access Regulations require all medical cannabis users to obtain their prescription from a limited number of sources:

- Personally grown
- Produced by a designated individual for that person
- From a licensed dealer

At the time, there was only a single licensed dealer in Canada, which grew in Manitoba and processed in Saskatchewan, making it difficult to access. A multitude of users requested a single designate, of which all applications were denied except for one. This regulatory structure was, they argued, a violation of the Section 7 of the Canadian Charter of Rights and Freedoms, because it forced sufferers to go through illicit channels to obtain medical cannabis, to which they were legally entitled. Thus, they were being forced to break the law in order to ensure their constitutionally-protected right to "security of the person."

The court agreed with this reasoning and struck down subsection 41(b.1) as being of no force or effect.

This, however, does not concern the non-medical use of cannabis.

=== 2011: R. v. Mernagh (Ontario Superior Court) ===
On 12 April 2011, Justice Donald Taliano found that Canada's Marijuana Medical Access Regulations (MMAR) and "the prohibitions against the possession and production of cannabis contained in sections 4 and 7 respectively of the Controlled Drugs and Substances Act" are "constitutionally invalid and of no force and effect". The government was given 90 days (until 11 July) to fill the void in those sections, or the possession and cultivation of cannabis would become legal in all of Ontario. This includes the non-medical use of the drug.

The mid-July deadline was extended when federal government lawyers argued that current cannabis laws and regulations should stay in place until Ontario's highest court could hear the appeal, which took place over 7 and 8 May 2012. In granting the deadline extension, the Court of Appeal noted that "The practical effect of the decision if the suspension were permitted to expire on 14 July would be to legalize cannabis production in Ontario, if not across Canada." The decision released 1 February 2013 states that the Ontario's Appeals Court has upheld current cannabis laws in Canada, overturning the decision made by the lower court judge in 2011. In the decision, the appeals court ruled that the lower court judge had made several errors in striking down Canada's cannabis laws, citing an absence of a constitutional right to use medical cannabis. The court also stated that Mernagh failed to provide evidence from a doctor that he met the criteria for the use of medical marijuana. The decision was met with criticism and disappointment from many in Canada, including the Canadian HIV/AIDS Legal Network. After the ruling, they restated Mernagh's (and many other medical marijuana users in Canada) issue with the current cannabis rules: "Allowing the current regulations to stand unchanged will leave many people with serious health conditions without effective access to legal authorization to use cannabis as medicine."

=== 2015: R v. Smith (Supreme Court of Canada) ===
The Supreme Court ruled in this case that the restrictions limiting authorized patients to dried marijuana under the MMAR and the MMPR were unconstitutional.

=== 2016: Allard et al v. Regina ===
Injunctive relief granted by Judge Manson to those previously licensed under MMAR within certain dates. MMPR declared unconstitutional by BC Superior Court, declaration suspended for 6 months to allow government time to respond to ruling and reincorporate personal production.

== Preliminary steps to legalization ==
After the Liberal party formed a majority government after the 2015 Canadian federal election, Prime Minister Justin Trudeau announced that a federal-provincial-territorial process was being created to discuss a jointly suitable process for decriminalizing Cannabis in Canada for personal use. The plan was to remove cannabis consumption and incidental possession from the Controlled Drugs and Substances Act. In November 2015, Justice Minister Jody Wilson-Raybould said that she and the ministers of Health and Public Safety were working on specifics as to the legislation. During the United Nations General Assembly on the World Drug Problem in New York City in April 2016, Health Minister Jane Philpott announced the Canadian government's plan to introduce new legislation to the House of Commons the following spring.

Since that time, some people with minor convictions for cannabis possession are asking whether the Government of Canada plans to give them pardons that would allow them to travel to the United States and to get employment in certain fields. As of 22 December 2015, a decision had not yet been made in this regard. Wilson-Raybould said that conversations with various levels of government will be required before making a decision on this issue.

While the legislation was enacted, making Cannabis in Canada legal for all intents and purposes, sales for recreational use did not commence until October, 2018.

Cannabis will be taxed, producing revenues of $618 million per year initially and eventually, billions, according to a report by Canada's Parliamentary Budget Officer (PBO) in 2016. A recent government estimate indicates that the illegal marijuana industry is worth $7-billion per year.

The Liberal Party of Canada tabled bill c-45, "An Act respecting cannabis" which was put forward to Parliament on 13 April 2017 with the intent of legalizing recreational use of Cannabis by 1 July 2018. Bill C-45, was in the Parliamentary process in late August 2017. Meetings were to be held 11–15 September 2017 and a report was expected by parliament by the end of September.

In the lead-up to marijuana legalization, in 2017 The Globe and Mail conducted an investigation into the use of chemicals by federally regulated marijuana companies. Their findings concluded the use of chemicals was far worse than the government knew. On 31 December the spokeswoman for Health Canada, Tammy Jarbeau, said, the government will "provide the Minister of Health with the authority to issue an administrative monetary penalty of up to $1-million per violation to a licensed producer for a violation of the Act or its regulations."

== Positions of Canadian political parties ==
The Liberal Party of Canada supported the legalization and regulation of cannabis for recreational use. Prime Minister Justin Trudeau supported ending the prohibition of marijuana, and defended his and the party's stance multiple times since announcing his candidacy for party leader. Since the Liberals won a majority of the seats in the House of Commons during the 2015 Canadian federal election, the Trudeau government had little difficulty passing legislation to make cannabis legal, but almost all Conservative party members of parliament voted in opposition to the legislation (one member voted for). However, Conservative Senators temporarily stalled the bill in parliamentary committees, proposing amendments including attempts to prohibit private cultivation, among other items.

The Conservative Party of Canada favours decriminalization of cannabis. Former Prime Minister of Canada and CPC leader Stephen Harper is quoted as saying, "Tobacco is a product that does a lot of damage. Marijuana is infinitely worse and it's something that we do not want to encourage." Past CPC interim leader Rona Ambrose had on multiple occasions reiterated Mr. Harper's position, but had also stated that she wanted Trudeau's government to "get a move on" with their plan.

The New Democratic Party supported the legalization and regulation of cannabis in the federal election of 2015. The NDP promised to immediately decriminalize cannabis should they form government. The NDP party leader Thomas Mulcair publicly clarified his support for decriminalization in 2012.

The Green Party of Canada supported the regulation and taxation of cannabis.

The Bloc Québécois supported the decriminalization of cannabis.

The Libertarian Party of Canada supports ending drug prohibition, including cannabis.

The Marijuana Party of Canada championed cannabis legalization at the federal level. The party still exists after the legalization of cannabis in Canada. This is largely due to criticisms it has with how cannabis has been legalized in Canada and changes it wants made to laws, rules and regulations, and changes to cannabis business related matters. Provincial parties also exist, including the British Columbia Marijuana Party and Bloc pot.

The Christian Heritage Party rejects the decriminalization of cannabis and demanded that the prohibition be maintained for the health and safety of Canadian society and Canadian youth.

== See also ==
By province or territory

- Alberta
- British Columbia
- Manitoba
- New Brunswick
- Newfoundland and Labrador
- Northwest Territories
- Nova Scotia

- Nunavut
- Ontario
- Prince Edward Island
- Quebec
- Saskatchewan
- Yukon
- Canadian Indian reserves
