= Cannabis laws of Canada by province or territory =

Map of age of legal cannabis use per province Minimum age is 21 Minimum age is 19 Minimum age is 18

On October 17, 2018, cannabis was legalized in Canada for recreational and medical purposes. It was already legal for medicinal purposes, under conditions outlined in the Marihuana for Medical Purposes Regulations issued by Health Canada since 2001, and for seed, grain, and fibre production under licence by Health Canada.

The legalization for recreational purposes was achieved with the passage of Bill C-45, the Cannabis Act by Parliament on 19 June 2018. Legalization was effective on October 17, 2018. Adults 18 and over can possess up to 30 grams (1.05 oz) of dried or “equivalent non-dried form” in public. Adults are also allowed to make cannabis-infused food and drinks "as long as organic solvents are not used to create concentrated products."

== Summary ==
Although the Cannabis Act allows for legal use of cannabis, provinces and territories are allowed to enact restrictions and regulations regarding sale, distribution, and use of cannabis. For example, each province and territory set its own procedures for retail sales, and these vary as to ownership or retail outlets (by the provincial government or private enterprise) but all include an option for online sales.

While each household is allowed to grow up to four cannabis plants from "licensed seed or seedlings", Quebec chose to be excluded from this aspect of the legislation so it is not legal in the province. Manitoba permits home growing only with a medical licence.

While specific regulations vary among provinces and territories, there are some general rules regarding promotion, packaging, and advertising. Adult-use cannabis can only be sold in packages of a single color without graphics other than the logo and a health warning. Cannabis companies in Canada are not allowed to promote themselves through TV commercials, billboards, or glossy magazine ads, sponsor people or events, or put their names on sports and cultural facilities.

Crossing international borders with cannabis is illegal.

=== Cannabis in Canada ===
Province	Minimum age of purchase	Allows growing at home for personal use only	Home storage limit	Plants per household	Allows use in public	Sold by private retailers (under provincial government oversight)	Sold by public retailers (under provincial government oversight)	Sold by government run retail locations	Physical stores	Online sales	Transporting
Alberta	18	Yes	None	Four	Only where tobacco may be smoked.	Yes	Yes	Yes	306 approved by AGLC (Oct 2019)	Yes with provincial license	Must be secured in closed packaging and not within reach of the driver or occupants.
British Columbia	19	Yes but cannot be visible from a public space	1,000 grams (2 lb 3¼ oz)	Four	There is a ban on smoking or vaping cannabis in playgrounds, schools, and other public areas used by kids. Can be mostly used where tobacco is smoked.	Yes	Yes	Yes	489 approved by BC Liquor and Cannabis Licensing Branch	Government-operated	Must be in a sealed package, or inaccessible to any passengers. Allowed to drive with no more than four cannabis plants that are not flowering.
Manitoba	19	No	No	Prohibited	No	No	Yes	No	159 (as of December 2025)	Privately-operated	Must be stored in a secure compartment, such as a trunk.
New Brunswick	19	Yes	None	Four	No	No	No	Yes	20 (as of December 2017; i.e. medical cannabis dispensaries)	Government-operated	No restriction
Newfoundland and Labrador	19	Yes	None	Four	No	Yes	Yes	No	Yes	Government-operated	Must be in a sealed package or not readily available to anyone in the vehicle, unless the vehicle is being used as a dwelling. Passengers on taxis and buses are allowed to carry cannabis.
Northwest Territories	19	Yes	None	Four	Yes, on trails, highways, streets, roads and in parks when they are not in use for public events.		Yes	Yes	Five (as of December 2017; i.e. medical cannabis dispensaries)	Government-operated	Must be unopened or be stored in a place that is out of reach for any passengers.
Nova Scotia	19	Yes	None	Four	Yes, anywhere tobacco can be smoked	No	No	Yes	43 (Aug 2022)	Government-operated	Must be in a closed package or packaging that is fastened closed and out of reach from anyone in the vehicle
Nunavut	19	Yes	150 grams (5¼ oz)	Four	Can be mostly used where tobacco is smoked, with the exception of vehicles, school grounds, hospital or health centre grounds, and playgrounds.	TBD	TBD	No	No	Government-operated	Must not be within reach of anyone in a vehicle.
Ontario	19	Yes	None	Four	Yes, only where tobacco is smoked, with the exception of vehicles.	Yes	Yes	Yes	324 (Dec 2020)	Government-operated	Must be sealed or not readily available to anyone in the vehicle.
Prince Edward Island	19	Yes	None	Four	No	No	No	Yes	Five (as of December 2025)	Government-operated	Required to be secure and inaccessible to anyone in the vehicle if opened.
Quebec	21 (Note: Formerly 18 before 1 January 2020.)	No	150 grams (5¼ oz)	Prohibited	No, formerly anywhere tobacco can be smoked.	No	Yes	Yes	114 (as of November 2026)	Government-operated	No restriction
Saskatchewan	19	Yes	None	Four	No	Yes	Yes	No	Yes	Privately-operated	Allowed in a vehicle, provided it is not being ingested, it was bought legally and is being transported to a place where it will be legally ingested.
Yukon	19	Yes	None	Four	No	No	No	Yes	13 (as of December 2025)	Government-operated	Must be in a closed container and inaccessible to all passengers.

== 2018 poll on minimum age regulation ==
According to one poll conducted in 2018 by the Angus Reid Institute, approximately half of respondents believed the minimum age to purchase and consume cannabis should be either 18 or 19, while the remainder of respondents believed the minimum age should be 20 or older.

== Alberta ==
Bill 26 was introduced in November, 2017 and will make cannabis consumption legal for adults 18 years of age and older. The bill received royal assent on December 15, 2017. Under the bill, private retailers may sell cannabis to the public, but online sales are reserved to the provincial government. As early as mid 2017, 45,000 citizens had provided input to Calgary city government for regulations on retail establishments and 60 stakeholders wanted to be part of post-draft regulation process.

The minimum age to use cannabis is 18 (the federal minimum) which Alberta shared with Quebec until 2020, with all other provinces setting the age at 19. Alberta also planned to allow public smoking of cannabis, to fall under the same restrictions as public smoking of tobacco.

The recreational use of marijuana was legalized Canada-wide on 17 October 2018. As expected, the minimum age in Alberta is 18 and sales are made at private enterprise stores licensed by Alberta Gaming, Liquor and Cannabis or from the government's web site. Retail stores licensed to sell cannabis must not also sell alcohol, tobacco or pharmaceuticals. The product available includes dried flower, milled flower, plant seeds, oil, capsules and pre-rolls. Edibles will not be legal until late 2019 at the earliest. The rules as to where cannabis can be consumed vary from city to city, but typically, Albertans can do so in their homes and in some public spaces where cigarette smoking is allowed, but cannabis use is banned in cars. Specific laws about driving under the influence of cannabis are in place.

As of 10 January 2019, there were 17 (private enterprise) retail stores in operation.

== British Columbia ==
Government public service advertisement about the effects of cannabis use in Vancouver

After public consultation, British Columbia released a provincial regulatory framework for the sale and use of cannabis for recreational use. The framework proposed the minimum age to possess, purchase and consume cannabis will be 19 years old, which is the same age to buy alcohol. There would be a government-run wholesale distribution model and for on-line sales, although private and publicly run retail stores would operate. Cannabis consumption would be allowed in any public area where vaping and smoking is permitted, however, if the area is frequented by children, cannabis would be banned. Drug impaired driving would continue to be illegal.

In early October 2018, BC released its final set of rules and plans, replacing the July 2018 Interim Licensing Regulation. The new release provides specifics as to the licensing of stores and marketers, background checks, and enforcement methods and penalties for non-compliance by companies which have a license. The regulations include a maximum household possession limit of 1,000 grams (2 lb. 3¼ oz.) but only 30 grams (1 oz.) in public, no smoking or vaping in indoor public places (except in designated rooms), provincial parks, near schools, in vehicles, on boats, near bus stops, and within six meters of any doorway, window or air intake. (There are fewer restrictions as to where cannabis for medical use may be consumed.) Cannabis products that are allowed to be sold include oils, such as capsules tinctures and topical products cannabis plants or cannabis seeds, cannabis products marketed for pets and soap or bath products containing cannabis. Initially, there was only one cannabis store in B.C. (Kamloops) operated by the government, but over 100 private retailers had applied for licenses. Stores require municipal consent prior to approval.

Though the first year of cannabis retail in B.C. witnessed a slow rollout, the province now has well over 100 operational stores.

== Manitoba ==
In December 2017, Manitoba introduced the Safe and Responsible Retailing of Cannabis Act, detailing their plans for cannabis use and sales. The age for use would be set at 19, and communities would be allowed to opt-out of cannabis sales by plebiscite. Home-growing of cannabis would be prohibited. Manitoba Liquor and Lotteries would source all cannabis to retailers, where it will be sold in private-sector stores.

By the time recreational marijuana was legal in Canada, Manitoba had firmed up its rules. The minimum age is 19, cannabis must not be smoked or vaped in public, home growing is not legal and individuals may carry up to 30 grams (1 oz) of cannabis while in public. Purchases can be made on-line or at the provincially licensed retail stores operated by private enterprise companies. In October 2019, then Premier Brian Pallister announced plans to ban consumption of edibles in public in Manitoba by December.

As of 7 December 2021, there were 126 (private enterprise) retail stores in operation.

== New Brunswick ==
In 2017 the government announced that home-run New Brunswick Liquor Corporation would take charge of opening up to 20 cannabis stores in the province.

Proposed new laws in the province included limiting adults to carrying 30 grams (1 oz) of cannabis (with no limit inside the home), and requiring that cannabis in the home be stored in a locked container or room. Smoking cannabis will be banned in public places.

All of the plans and rules had been finalized by early October 2018. (The rules for medical cannabis were not modified in any way.) The minimum age to use, buy, grow or possess cannabis for recreational use is 19. Cannabis must not be consumed in a public place or in a motor vehicle, whether it's moving or not. Adults may buy up to 30 grams (1 oz) of cannabis from a Cannabis NB retail store, and possess no more than this amount in public, but there is no limit on the amount that may be possessed at an adult's home. Hotels and campgrounds can restrict the smoking and vaping of cannabis but not ban other methods of consumption. A household may grow up to four plants. Purchases may be made only through Cannabis NB, whether a store or e-commerce site; no advertising of the product is allowed.

As of 10 January 2019, there were 20 (government-run) retail stores in operation, but, apparently due to a shortage of product, had recently laid off some staff.

== Newfoundland and Labrador ==
In contrast with other Atlantic provinces, Newfoundland and Labrador planned to allow cannabis to be sold by licensed private retailers, though distribution and regulation will be run by the province's crown corporation, the Newfoundland and Labrador Liquor Corporation. The purchase age will be set at 19.

By October 2018, all of the plans and rules for recreational marijuana had been finalized. The province approved 22 retail stores, all privately operated, including ten by Dominion stores, but fully controlled and regulated by the NLC. Additional stores will be added after they are approved and licensed. The minimum age for use is 19. Cannabis is sold in dried flower, oil, and capsule form, in economy, midstream and premium quality levels. A maximum of 30 grams (1 oz) may be purchased at one time. Edibles will be legalized within one year.

Although medical marijuana may be smoked or vaped in public where tobacco smoking is allowed, recreational cannabis may be consumed only inside private dwellings, or in yards attached to those dwellings, never in a public place or in a vehicle. An RV being used as a residence qualifies as a private dwelling but is subject to any rules placed by the campground operator. Adults may grow up to four marijuana plants per household.

== Northwest Territories ==
Northwest Territories planned set the legal age for cannabis use at 19. Smoking would be allowed on private property, and public smoking will be "restricted in certain areas". The plan was for the Northwest Territories Liquor Commission to manage all import and distribution of cannabis, through retail outlets and by-mail. Similar to alcohol regulations, communities would be able to hold plebiscites to opt-out of cannabis sales in their jurisdiction.

By mid October 2018, the plan and rules for Northwest Territories had been finalized. A full eight to 10 products are offered and this is expected to increase significantly over time. Initially, five liquor stores were selling marijuana and also bongs and other accessories. The Liquor and Cannabis Commission regulates all pot sales in the territory. Online orders from the government web sites can also be made, with the cannabis delivered by Canada Post. Stores operated by private enterprise companies will be licensed in future. There are restrictions as to where cannabis may be smoked.

As of 10 January 2019, there were five (government-run) retail stores in operation.

== Nova Scotia ==
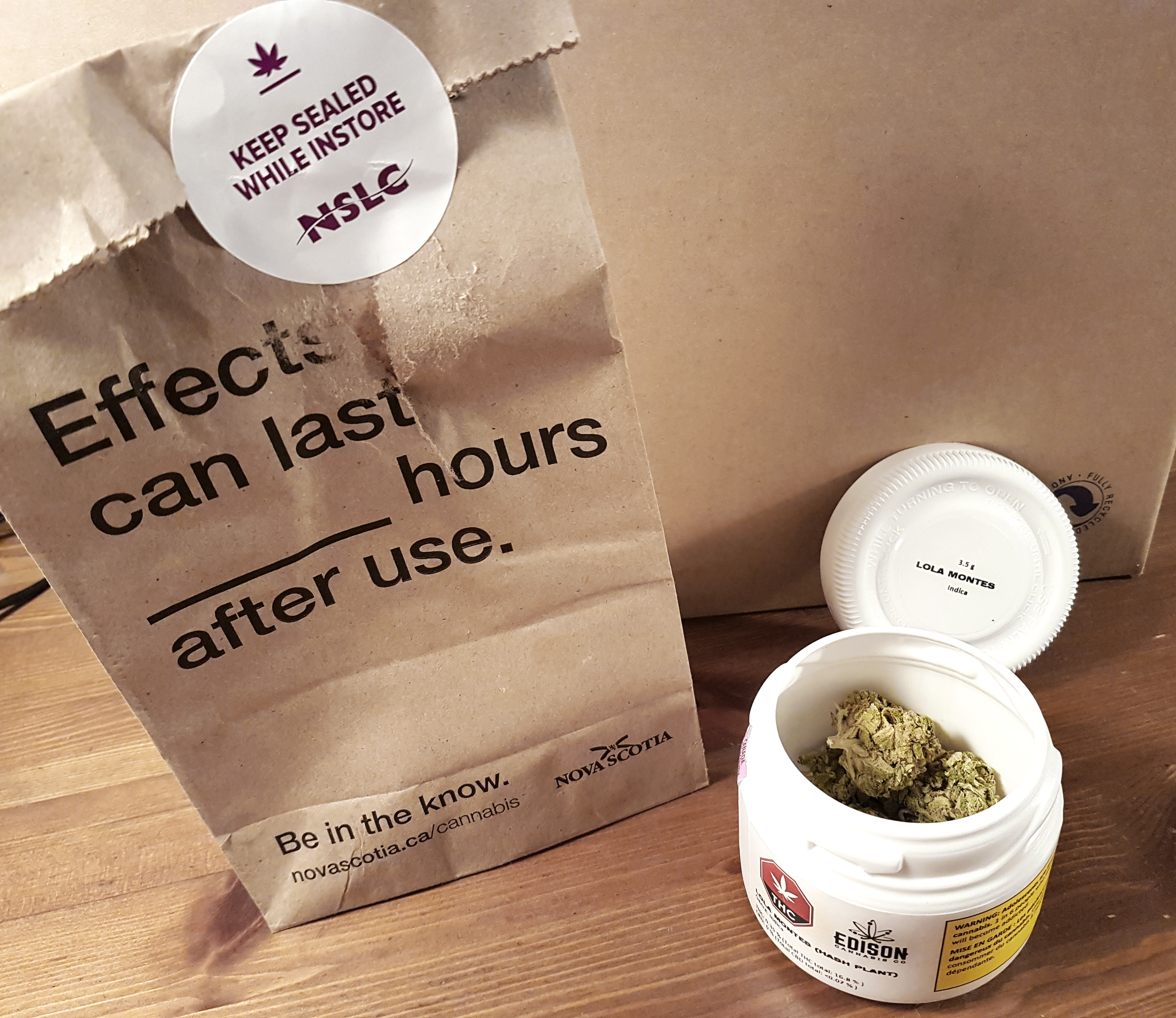
Legal purchase of recreational cannabis in Nova Scotia in October 2018.

The province's plan was for cannabis to be sold alongside alcohol at current stores run by the Nova Scotia Liquor Corporation (NSLC). The age of purchase is set at 19.

As expected, the legal age is 19 in Nova Scotia and only the Nova Scotia Liquor Corporation is allowed to sell marijuana; all but one of the 12 stores are selling both marijuana and liquor products; there is a single store that sells cannabis products exclusively. On-line sales are also available through the NSLC web site. Each household may grow up to four marijuana plants. The limit on possession at any give time is 30 grams (1 oz).

Just as locations for cigarette smoking are restricted by the Smoke Free Places Act, smoking or vaping of cannabis is also restricted, prohibited in many locations. Nova Scotia will also prohibit the use of cannabis in vehicles.

As of 10 January 2019, there were 20 (government-run) retail stores in operation, but they were experiencing a shortage of product.

== Nunavut ==
Due to delays caused by the October 30th territorial election in 2017, Nunavut was expected to be the last territory to announce its legal cannabis framework.

Sales are being made online, by phone and through agents of the Nunavut Liquor and Cannabis Commission. All of the product was initially provided by Tweed which offers 10 different strains of marijuana and lines like Leafs by Snoop. For some time, no stores will sell marijuana but private enterprise stores may be licensed in future. Communities will not be allowed to declare a prohibition on marijuana use but can refuse to accept a cannabis store. The minimum age for possession or use is 19. Restrictions on smoking the product are the same as for tobacco smoking. The NWT government was considering the legalization of lounges where cannabis may be consumed in a format other than smoking. No more than 30 grams (1 oz) may be bought at one time by an individual or carried in public.

As of 10 January 2019, the only method of purchasing cannabis was the on-line provincial store. No announcement had been made about the plan for storefront operations.

== Ontario ==
The Ontario Cannabis Store (OCS), a Crown corporation of the Government of Ontario, is the sole legal wholesaler and online retailer for cannabis in Ontario. OCS was initially planned to open a network of retail stores across the province, with several key cities having at least one store open in time for legalization, but the plans were shelved after the 2018 provincial election by the newly elected premier, Doug Ford in favour of allowing licensed private retailers. Despite this, 77 out of 414 municipal governments such as those of Mississauga, Markham, Vaughan, Richmond Hill, Oakville, Whitby, and Pickering among others, have passed by-laws prohibiting retail sales.

The minimum legal age to purchase and use cannabis in Ontario is 19, and adults can carry up to 30 grams (1 oz) in public. Cannabis edibles are available for commercial sale, and homemade food and drinks can be made. Ontario's cannabis legislation allows for vaping and smoking the product in public wherever tobacco may be smoked. Home-growing is permitted, with up to four plants per household.

In 2019, the government initially issued 25 retail licenses for brick-and-mortar stores to sell recreational cannabis; the selection was based on strict criteria and a lottery system. An additional 50 licenses were subsequently issued. By April 2020, the government planned to eliminate the lottery system and to begin issuing roughly 20 new permits per month to increase availability as part of the plan to combat sales by black market dealers. Retail on-line sales of recreational cannabis remained in the hands of the Ontario Cannabis Store, operated by the provincial government.

== Prince Edward Island ==
In December 2017, Prince Edward Island announced preliminary regulations for the 2018 federal legalization of cannabis. Per the plan, the Prince Edward Island Liquor Control Commission will administer all cannabis shops, which will be standalone stores, and the purchasing age will be fixed at age 19.

A public survey was held in August and September 2017, asking residents their opinions on legal age, commerce, etc. The survey received over 3,000 responses.

By early October 2018, all of the plans and rules for recreational cannabis had been finalized for Prince Edward Island. The legal age for possession or use is 19 and there are many locations where cannabis consumption is prohibited, including in any vehicle or boat. Adults may also grow marijuana plants, up to four per household. The Highway Traffic Act will be amended to include cannabis intoxication in a motor vehicle, similar to alcohol. Adults may possess up to 30 grams (1 oz) of cannabis away from home but there is no limit to the amount kept in the home, if it is secure from access by those under age 19.

The government's Prince Edward Island Cannabis Management Corporation, will operate four cannabis retail stores in 2018 in addition to their online store, selling dried cannabis, cannabis oil, seeds and seedlings. Additional stores may be added in future. No other entity is licensed to retail recreational cannabis in the province. Cannabis for medical use is still sold only by licensed producers; no change in this aspect has been made.

== Quebec ==
The Société québécoise du cannabis (SQDC) is the only legal entity to transport or sell cannabis at the retail level in Quebec. In contrast to the common age minimum of 19 in most provinces, in Quebec the age limit is 21 and home-growing is not permitted.

In October 2018, Lionel Carmant, the junior health minister announced on behalf of the Coalition Avenir Québec (CAQ) government that the legal age to consume will be raised to 21 from 18, effective 1 January 2020. In 2019, the CAQ announced Quebec will also ban the sale of cannabis candies and desserts, including chocolate, because they believed that federal cannabis regulations didn't go far enough in protecting children from accidentally consuming the drug through these means.

Twelve SQDC stores opened on 17 October, and another three were expected to open within weeks. A full 150 different products are sold, in dried, fresh or oil format, but not edibles, as well as accessories such as vaporizers. On-line sales from the SQDC web site also commenced on 17 October. Adults may possess up to 30 grams (1 oz) of dried cannabis, the maximum allowed per purchase, but a full 150 grams (5¼ oz) may be kept in a household, regardless of the number of adult residents. While allowed under federal law, Quebec prohibits the growing of marijuana plants even for personal use. Under Quebec's law, it is prohibited to cultivate cannabis for personal use.

The consumption of cannabis is heavily restricted; it cannot be used wherever tobacco smoking is prohibited, as well as in a long list of other locations. Some municipalities have restricted smoking in some or all public spaces, but this does not include Montreal. Impairment under the influence of drugs is illegal as it is for drunk driving.

As of 13 August 2022, there were 87 (government-run) retail stores in operation

== Saskatchewan ==
In March 2018, the Saskatchewan Liquor and Gaming Authority released its framework for distribution, sale and use of cannabis. This framework includes setting the minimum age for non-medicinal cannabis consumption at 19 years of age. Legislation is being considered to prohibit the possession by a minor. Consuming cannabis in public spaces will be prohibited and drug-impaired driving will continue to be illegal. The province will adopt the federal minimum standards around home production, including a limit of four plants per household.

By October 2018, the rules and plans had been finalized. Under provincial cannabis legislation, the minimum legal age for purchase or use is 19, and recreational cannabis may not be consumed in public spaces or in any vehicle; other restrictions apply as to where the product may be consumed. An adult may carry up to 30 grams (1 oz) of cannabis. Driving while impaired is illegal, whether the cannabis is used for medical or recreational purposes. Adults may grow up to four marijuana plants per household for personal use; restrictions may be placed by landlords or condo corporations. Only six cannabis stores were open initially operated by private enterprise companies and licensed by the province; on-line purchases could also be made from the provincial web site.

As of 10 January 2019, there were 17 (private enterprise) retail stores in operation, with 34 others still in the approval process.

== Yukon ==
For Yukon's proposed framework, the territory planned to have one government-owned physical store in the main city of Whitehorse, and online sales to reach more distant communities. The minimum age for cannabis use would be 19.

By 17 October 2018, the Cannabis Yukon store in Whitehorse and the territory's e-commerce retail site were operating. They stocked "over 30 strains and 120 unique products including dried flower, milled flower, pre-rolled, oils and capsules". Product ordered online is delivered by Canada Post. The Yukon Liquor Corporation planned to set up a cannabis licensing board by spring 2019 to accept applications from private companies to operate retail stores.

As of 10 January 2019, there was only a single (government-run) retail store in operation.

== First Nations reserves ==
While various First Nations communities have differing approaches to the prospect of a legal cannabis economy, First Nations leaders have called for more local control of the cannabis economy on their reserves.

== See also ==
- Legal history of cannabis in Canada
- Cannabis Act
- Former medical marihuana regulations in Canada
- Criminal Code (Cannabis)
- Legality of cannabis by U.S. jurisdiction
- Legality of cannabis by country
