= Cannabis in Newfoundland and Labrador =

Map of age of legal cannabis use per province Minimum age is 21 Minimum age is 19 Minimum age is 18

Cannabis in Newfoundland and Labrador became legal when the national Cannabis Act went into force on October 17, 2018.

Cannabis in Canada has been legal for medicinal purposes since 2001 under conditions outlined in the Marihuana for Medical Purposes Regulations, later superseded by the Access to Cannabis for Medical Purposes Regulations, issued by Health Canada and seed, grain, and fibre production was permitted under licence by Health Canada.

The federal Cannabis Act, legalizing cannabis for recreational use, came into effect on October 17, 2018. Each province and territory set its own laws for various aspects, such as the legal age, whether householders can grow cannabis and the method of retail sales.

== Legalization for recreational use ==
Newfoundland and Labrador (NL) planned to allow cannabis to be sold by licensed private retailers, a common store is Tweed which has multiple locations on the island. Distribution and regulation will be run by the province's crown corporation Newfoundland and Labrador Liquor Corporation. The purchase age was to be 19. Consumption of cannabis would be limited to private residences. In contrast with other Atlantic provinces, NL planned to allow cannabis to be sold by licensed private retailers, though distribution and regulation will be run by the province's crown corporation Newfoundland and Labrador Liquor Corporation.

By October 2018, all of the plans and rules for recreational marijuana had been finalized. The province approved 22 retail stores, all privately operated, including ten by Dominion stores, but fully controlled and regulated by the NLC. Additional stores will be added after they are approved and licensed. The minimum age for use is 19. Cannabis is sold in dried flower, oil, and capsule form, in economy, midstream and premium quality levels. A maximum of 30 grams may be purchased at one time. Edibles will be legalized within one year.

Although medical marijuana may be smoked or vaped in public where tobacco smoking is allowed, recreational cannabis may be consumed only inside private dwellings, or in yards attached to those dwellings, never in a public place or in a vehicle. An RV being used as a residence qualifies as a private dwelling but is subject to any rules placed by the campground operator. Adults may grow up to four marijuana plants per household.

== Usage ==
In 2013, 11.1 percent of residents reported that they consumed cannabis in the past twelve months, the fourth lowest in the country. In 2017, Statistics Canada reported that the province had the seventh highest per capita usage in the country of 18.52 grams per person.

== See also ==
- Legal history of cannabis in Canada
- Cannabis in Canada
- Cannabis laws of Canada by province or territory
