= Cannabis in Nova Scotia =

Map of age of legal cannabis use per province Minimum age is 21 Minimum age is 19 Minimum age is 18

Cannabis has been legal in Nova Scotia and the entire country of Canada since October 17, 2018, the effective date of the Cannabis Act. Each province and territory set its own laws for various aspects, such as the legal age, whether householders can grow cannabis and the method of retail sales. Cannabis has been legal in Canada for medicinal purposes since 2001 under conditions outlined in the Marihuana for Medical Purposes Regulations, later superseded by the Access to Cannabis for Medical Purposes Regulations, issued by Health Canada and seed, grain, and fibre production was permitted under licence by Health Canada.

== Recreational laws ==
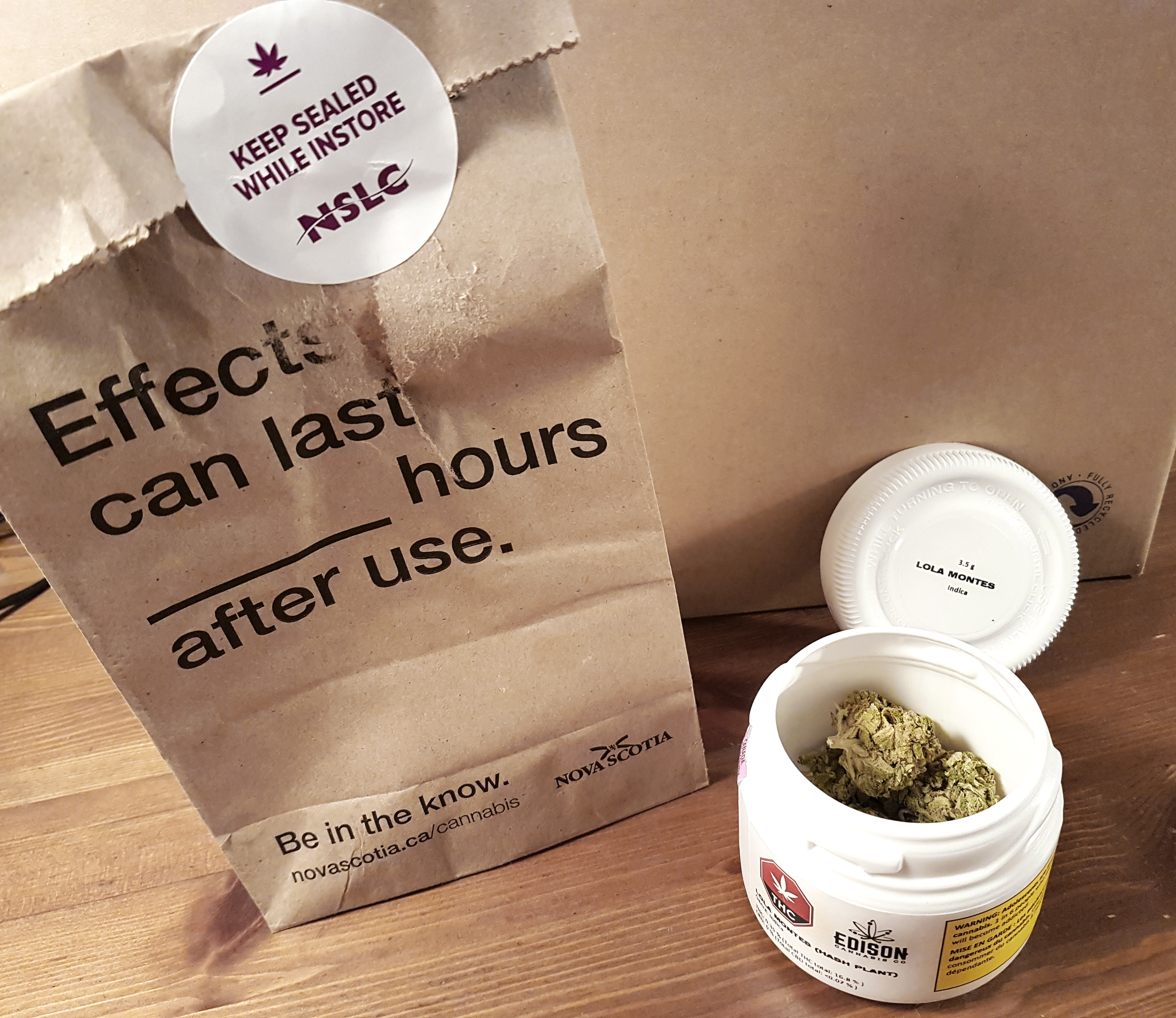
Example of a recreational cannabis purchase at a Nova Scotia Liquor Corporation cannabis store in 2018.

The legal age for possessing, distributing, consuming, and purchasing cannabis is 19 years old. Only the Nova Scotia Liquor Corporation is allowed to sell cannabis through their own retail stores and online through their website. All of the 12 cannabis retail stores also contain alcohol with the exception of one store in Halifax. Each household may grow up to four cannabis plants. Individuals may possess up to 30 grams in public and there is no limit on the amount of cannabis an individual can have on their property.

Smoking or vaping cannabis in public is subject to the same restrictions as smoking cigarettes under the Smoke Free Places Act. Using cannabis while in a vehicle is prohibited under section 22 of the Cannabis Control Act. While transporting cannabis in vehicles, it must in closed packaging or packaging that is fastened closed and out of reach of or not readily accessible to any person in the vehicle.

== Medical cannabis ==
As of February 2019 there were four licensed producers of medical cannabis located in Nova Scotia.

== Usage ==
Nova Scotia has the highest cannabis usage per capita in Canada. In 2012, the province led the country with the highest percentage of males and females who indicated they have used cannabis in their lifetime, with 56.6 and 40.7 percent, respectively. That same year, the province also led the country with the highest percentage of residents using cannabis within the past year at 16 percent. In 2013, 14.8 percent of residents reported that they consumed cannabis in the past twelve months, the highest in the country. In 2017, Statistics Canada reported that the province had the highest per capita usage in the country of 27.06 grams per person. In 2018, the province had the highest percentage of residents 15 years old or older reporting using cannabis in the last three months, leading the country in every quarter that year.

== Illegal sales ==
Cannabis can only be purchased legally in Nova Scotia at the NSLC. There are 51 locations which sell legal cannabis in the province, one of which is located on a First Nations reserve. Despite this restriction, there are many unlicensed retailers of cannabis products located on First Nations reserves, with the provincial justice department estimating at least 118 of these stores were operating. In 2025, the justice minister directed Nova Scotia police agencies to enforce cannabis legislation and crack down on these illegal sales. In response to this directive, Sipekne'katik First Nation banned Premier Tim Houston and two ministers from their reserves, declaring that they are "banned as undesirables", a threat carrying a $50,000 fine. Houston characterized the ban as "bizarre".

Houston has claimed that unregulated cannabis sold in Nova Scotia has been found to contain trace amounts of fentanyl. The Nova Scotia RCMP said otherwise, stating that they are "not aware of any fentanyl having been detected in cannabis products seized by the RCMP from illegal storefronts in the province".
