= Cannabis in Prince Edward Island =

Map of age of legal cannabis use per province Minimum age is 21 Minimum age is 19 Minimum age is 18

Cannabis in Prince Edward Island became legal when the national Cannabis Act went into force on October 17, 2018.

Cannabis in Canada has been legal for medicinal purposes since 2001 under conditions outlined in the Marihuana for Medical Purposes Regulations, later superseded by the Access to Cannabis for Medical Purposes Regulations, issued by Health Canada and seed, grain, and fibre production was permitted under licence by Health Canada.

The federal Cannabis Act, legalizing cannabis for recreational use, came into effect on October 17, 2018. Each province and territory set its own laws for various aspects, such as the legal age, whether householders can grow cannabis and the method of retail sales.

== Legalization for recreational use ==
Canada's federal legislation enabling the sale of cannabis fixes the legal possession limit for adults at 30 grams (1.1 oz) of dried cannabis, but permits the provinces to set the legal age for possession and regulations for distribution and retail sales of cannabis. A public survey was held in August and September 2017, asking residents their opinions on legal age, commerce, etc. The survey received over 3,000 responses.

In December 2017 the PEI government announced preliminary regulations for cannabis in the province, with plans and rules for recreational cannabis finalized by October 2018. The legal age for possession or use is 19 and there are many locations where cannabis consumption is prohibited, including in any vehicle or boat. Adults may also grow marijuana plants, up to four per household. The Highway Traffic Act will be amended to include cannabis intoxication in a motor vehicle, similar to alcohol. Adults may possess up to 30 grams of cannabis away from home but there is no limit to the amount kept in the home, if it is secure from access by those under age 19. No other entity is licensed to retail recreational cannabis in the province, and cannabis for medical use is still sold only by licensed producers.

The Prince Edward Island Cannabis Management Corporation (PEICMC, or PEI Cannabis) opened three retail outlets in Charlottetown, Summerside, and Montague on October 17, 2018, with a fourth in O'Leary opened January 25, 2019 due to construction delays. PEI Cannabis also operates an e-commerce site offering online sales with direct home delivery.

In the first six weeks of legalization, Prince Edward Island topped per-capita spending on legal cannabis nationwide, with residents spending an average of $13.83 compared to the national average of $2.65. The province's finance department reported that sales up to the end of 2018 totaled CA$3,509,913.

== Cannabis suppliers ==
As of 2017 only one company, Canada's Island Garden, was licensed to grow medical cannabis in Prince Edward Island. The government announced in January 2018 that it had selected Canada's Island Garden to supply the province's cannabis outlets, along with Organigram in Moncton, New Brunswick and Canopy Growth Corporation in Smith's Falls, Ontario. In September 2018 PEI Cannabis announced that eight more suppliers had signed agreements with the provincial retailer.

== Usage ==
In 2013, 10.4 percent of residents reported that they consumed cannabis in the past twelve months, the second lowest in the country. In 2017, Statistics Canada reported that the province had the sixth highest per capita usage in the country of 18.95 grams per person.

== Criticism ==
The government's plan to operate only four retail outlets with only three suppliers was criticized by consumer groups, saying the plan would not provide enough access to legal marijuana to deter consumers from continuing to purchase from the black market.

== See also ==
- Legal history of cannabis in Canada
