= Société des alcools du Québec =

Canadian alcoholic beverages retail chain

- Formerly: Quebec Liquor Commission (1921–61); Régie des alcools du Québec (1961–71)
- Type: State-owned enterprise
- Industry: Retail
- Founded: 1921
- Headquarters: 7500, rue Tellier; Montreal, Quebec; H1N 3W5
- Key people: Jacques Farcy, CEO and President
- Products: Liquor sales to consumers and businesses
- Revenue: ▲CA$4.048 billion (2023)
- Net income: ▲CA$1.426 billion (2023)
- Owner: Government of Quebec
- Number of employees: More than 7500 (2016)
- Subsidiaries: Société québécoise du cannabis
- Website: www.saq.com

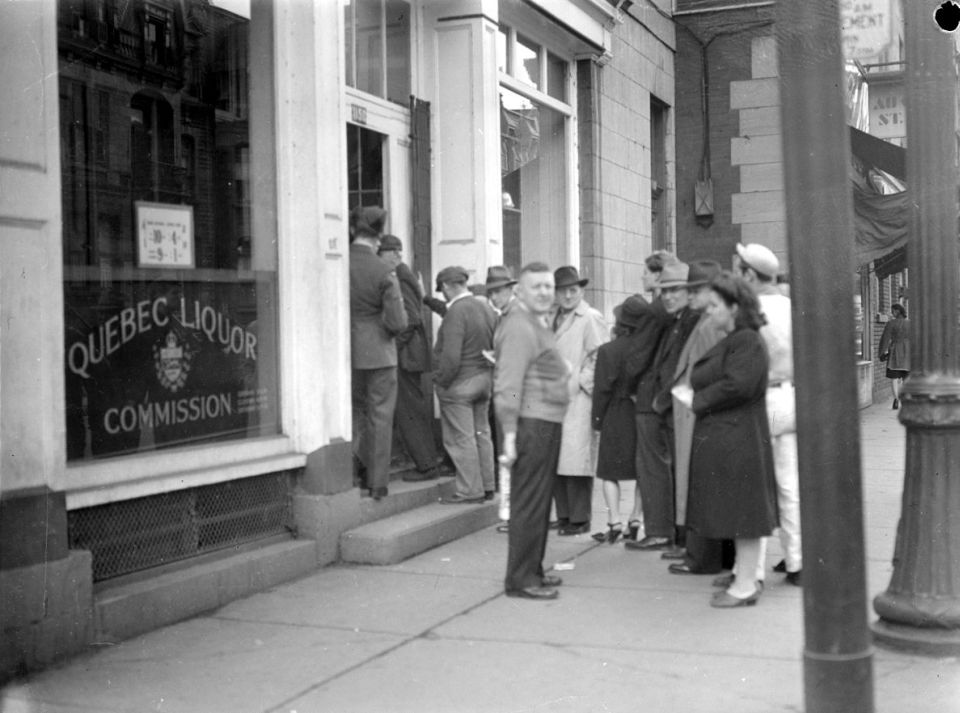
A line of customers waiting to enter the store in the Quebec Liquor Commission located Saint Denis Street in Montreal. September 23, 1944.

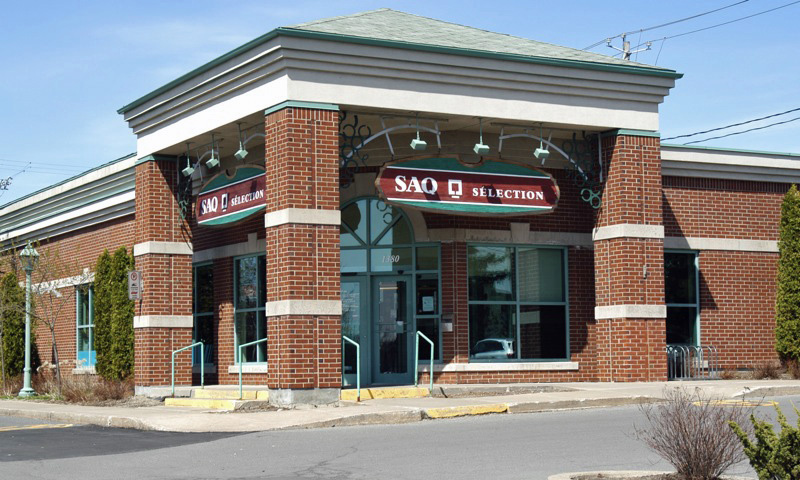
A suburban SAQ store.

The Société des alcools du Québec (SAQ; transl. Québec Liquor Corporation) is a provincial state-owned enterprise and monopoly in Quebec responsible for the trade of alcoholic beverages, and via subsidiary, cannabis, within the province.

== Organization ==
The official legislation governing the SAQ's operations and management is the Act respecting the Société des alcools du Québec (R.S.Q. S-13). The sole share-holder is the Minister of Finance of the Quebec government.

The Société des alcools du Québec headquarters are located in Montreal.

The symbol of the SAQ represents three aspects of SAQ stores:

- The white letter "Q" represents the province of Quebec
- The red wine glass
- The image of a store front

The SAQ operates more than 400 stores under six different banners throughout Quebec:

- SAQ (Classique): varied selection, in towns and villages where there is only one SAQ branch
- SAQ Express: top-selling products, in large urban centres, extended business hours
- SAQ Sélection: extended selection, professional service and counselling
- SAQ Dépôt: warehouse-style stores, wholesale packages
- SAQ.com: Webstore

Some wines and low-alcoholic-content beverages are also sold in Quebec in supermarkets.

== Presidents-general managers ==
- Georges-A. Simard (CLQ)
- L.-B. Cordeau (CLQ)
- Arthur Savoie (CLQ)
- J.-Édouard Tellier (CLQ)
- Édouard Archambault (CLQ)
- Lorne G. Power (RAQ)
- Roger Laverdure (RAQ)
- Jacques Desmeules (1971–1978)
- Daniel Wermelinger (1978–1983)
- Jean-Guy Lord (1983–1986)
- Jocelyn Tremblay (1986–1997)
- Gaétan Frigon (1998–2002)
- Louis L. Roquet (2003–2004)
- Sylvain Toutant (2004–2007)
- Philippe Duval (2008–2013)
- Alain Brunet (2014–2018)
- Catherine Dagenais (2018–2023)
- Jacques Farcy (2023-

== Alcohol consumption in Quebec ==
As the sole provider of alcohol in Quebec, the SAQ's market data gives an overview of alcohol consumption in the province. In its 2015–2016 annual report, the Corporation states that 79.3% of sales through the SAQ stores and grocery stores were table wines. The remainder was shared among various products: 14.8% were spirits, 3.9% coolers, 1.7% beers and 0.3% ciders and other products.

=== Legal age of purchase ===
The age of purchase of alcohol is 18 in Quebec and there are restrictions as to who can purchase alcoholic beverages (R.S.Q. I-8.1). By law, SAQ stores cannot sell alcohol to minors or adults intent on distributing to minors (including the holders of parental authority). Nonetheless, underage persons are not restricted from SAQ stores. Official policy is to ask for photo identification from any customer who looks under 25.

=== Opening hours ===
The opening hours of most SAQ stores are dictated by the provincial law, which forbids sales of all alcohol before 9 AM and after 11 PM. However most stores close at 6 PM on Monday through Wednesday, 9 PM Thursday and Friday, and at 5 PM on Saturday and Sunday. There are however SAQ Express outlets which carry a smaller range of products are open from 11 AM to 10 PM daily. Another 10-20 franchises also exist that allow to sell SAQ products (including liquor) until 9 PM, and all belong to Quebec-based grocery chain L'Inter-Marché, whose stores all open at 9 AM and close at 9 PM, every day.

== Distribution of cannabis ==
In late 2017, some eight months before the expected legalisation of marijuana for recreational use across the country, the Province was planning to have the SAQ manage the sale of the product. Initially, 20 stores would be opened; on-line sales would also be offered, with deliveries to customers made by Canada Post.

== History ==
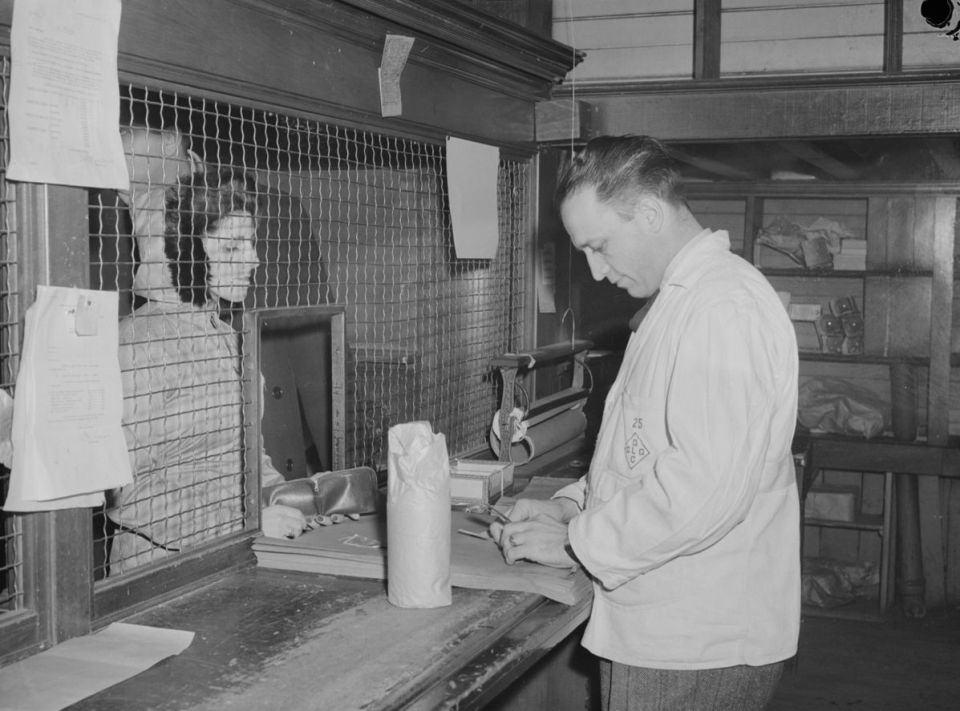
An employee of the Quebec Liquor Commission serving a client in Montreal, 1945

The Société des alcools du Québec was created in 1921 under the name Quebec Liquor Commission (Commission des liqueurs du Québec). In 1961, it became the Régie des alcools du Québec (Quebec Liquor Control) and, in 1971, the Société des alcools du Québec.

In 1921, an Alcoholic Beverages Act was passed and the Quebec Liquor Commission was established to conduct the trade of beer, wine and cider, and eventually spirits too. This provincial-owned corporation would then on exercise a legal monopoly on all distribution of alcohol in Quebec. In its first year, the commission established a quality control laboratory, opened 64 stores selling 383 products, employed 415 people and grossed $15 million in sales.

In Canada the struggle for the total ban of alcohol began in the 1898 national referendum, asking people if they wished total prohibition which included importation, manufacturing and sale of all types of alcohol beverages. Although the national results were extremely close with Yes leading by 2%, regional disparities were wide. In Quebec, 81% of voters ended up rejecting the prohibition proposal in contrast to the rest of Canada. In fear of splitting the country on a sharp divide between Catholic French and Protestant English Canada, then Prime Minister Wilfrid Laurier decided not to act upon the vote results. By 1917, every province except Quebec implemented a complete ban on alcohol. A year later, a law was proposed in Quebec calling for complete prohibition in 1919. The law was never enacted due to opposition from the public and the Catholic Church. Quebec did prohibit spirits, such as whisky and scotch, which came to be called partial prohibition. The government invoked illegal distillation, but mounting pressure forced it to backtrack. The Alcoholic Beverages Act abolished partial prohibition in 1921. This act created the Quebec Liquor Commission as a monopoly in distribution and retail of alcohol (SAQ, 2009). Officially, the government stated control of alcohol abuse as the official reason to create this new agency. Over the years, the SAQ increased its profits, which were transferred to the government. The Régie des alcools du Québec (RAQ) was created in 1961 in order to promote business growth, which opened its first self-service branch soon afterward. With the opening of other branches, the government began to focus on different aspects of alcohol sales in Quebec. “The government commissions a new study into the alcoholic beverage trade, creating the Thinel Commission for the purpose”. Based on the recommendations of the Thinel Commission in 1971, the Société des Alcools du Québec was founded in order to be in charge of sales. The SAQ took over the RAQ branches and employees and became strictly commercial. The SAQ continued to produce economic growth for the Quebec government as time went on. Its strength in commercialization prompted several privatization projects that were submitted to the government. Specifically in 1983, when it was announced that the SAQ retail network would be privatized, it was strongly opposed by unions. Petkantchin explains that this privatization project suffered many weaknesses: it involved privatizing “certain points of sale in Montreal” but with no competition allowed from the remaining SAQ stores. Petkantchin argues that “benefits to consumers of this partial privatization, had it gone ahead, would have been very limited.” Consumers would have remained “captive, with no real alternative”. Baffling the mind, the remaining SAQ branches would also have been sheltered from competition from the privatized stores, which would have been required to buy their merchandise from the SAQ at fixed prices.

== See also ==
- Pied-du-Courant Prison
- Liquor Control Board of Ontario
- Alberta Gaming and Liquor Commission
- Nova Scotia Liquor Corporation
- Société québécoise du cannabis
- Systembolaget
