= Murray‑Hall v Quebec (Attorney General) =

- Supreme Court of Canada

Hearing: September 15, 2022 Judgment: April 14, 2023
- Full case name: Janick Murray-Hall v Attorney General of Quebec
- Citations: 2023 SCC 10
- Docket No.: 39906
- Prior history: APPEAL from Procureur général du Québec c. Murray-Hall, 2021 QCCA 1325 (2 September 2021) (in French), setting aside Murray Hall c. Procureure générale du Québec, 2019 QCCS 3664 (3 September 2019) (in French). Leave to appeal granted, Janick Murray-Hall v. Attorney General of Quebec, 2022 CanLII 16724 (10 March 2022). Appeal dismissed.
- Ruling: The partial decriminalization of cannabis by Parliament opened the door to provincial legislative action. The regulation of cannabis use has a double aspect, since the federal criminal law power can be used to suppress some evil or injurious or undesirable effect upon the public, while provincial jurisdiction over property and civil rights and matters of a local or private nature extends to the regulating of the conditions of production, distribution and sale of the substance. The provincial Act’s public health and security objectives and its prohibitions in ss. 5 and 10 are therefore in harmony with the objectives of the federal Act, and there is no basis for finding a conflict of purposes.

Court membership
- Chief Justice: Richard Wagner; Puisne Justices: Andromache Karakatsanis, Suzanne Côté, Russell Brown, Malcolm Rowe, Sheilah Martin, Nicholas Kasirer, Mahmud Jamal, Michelle O'Bonsawin

Reasons given
- Unanimous reasons by: Wagner
- Brown did not participate in the final disposition of the judgment.

Laws applied
- Cannabis Act (Canada); Cannabis Regulation Act (Quebec)

Murray‑Hall v Quebec (Attorney General), 2023 SCC 10, a ruling of the Supreme Court of Canada in the area of Canadian constitutional law, specifically concerning the extent of the double aspect doctrine in the federal-provincial division of powers.

== Background ==
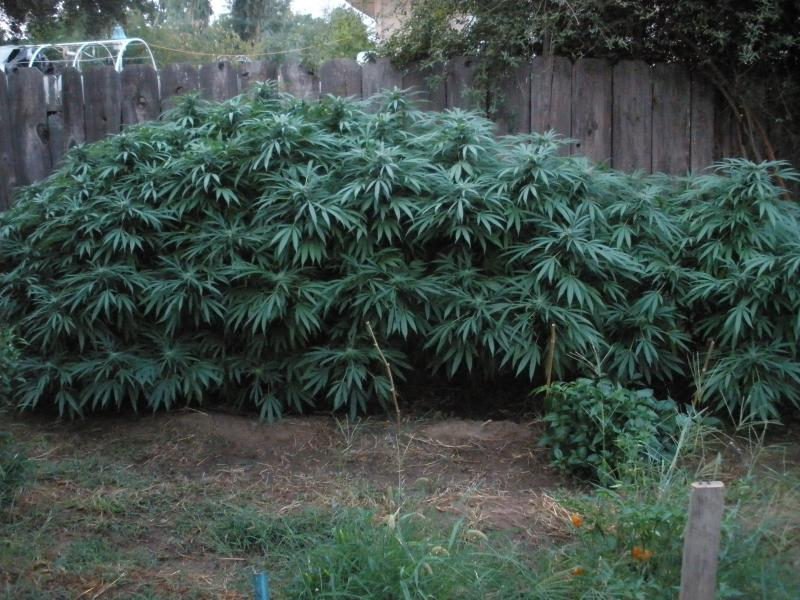
Row of cannabis plants

Cannabis indica had been treated as a prohibited drug in Canada since 1923, (Note: through its addition, together with hashish, to the Schedule of The Opium and Narcotic Drug Act, 1923, S.C. 1923, c. 22) and continued to be controlled as such into the 21st century. (Note: later legislation on the subject included the Narcotic Control Act and the Controlled Drugs and Substances Act)

In 2018, the Parliament of Canada passed the Cannabis Act and An Act to amend the Criminal Code (offences relating to conveyances), which legalized recreational cannabis use in Canada. While prohibiting the possession of cannabis plants and their cultivation for personal purposes, it exempted the possession and cultivation of no more than four plants from these prohibitions. In response, the National Assembly of Quebec passed legislation that created a provincial monopoly on the sale of cannabis, as well as prohibiting the possession of cannabis plants and their cultivation for personal purposes in a dwelling‑house. (Note: An Act to constitute the Société québécoise du cannabis, to enact the Cannabis Regulation Act and to amend various highway safety-related provisions, L.Q. 2018, c. 19 , of which Part II enacted the Cannabis Regulation Act.) (Note: the Legislative Assembly of Manitoba passed similar legislation through The Liquor, Gaming and Cannabis Control Act, CCSM , c. L153 , as enacted by The Safe and Responsible Retailing of Cannabis Act (Liquor and Gaming Control Act and Manitoba Liquor and Lotteries Corporation Act Amended), S.M. 2018, c. 9)

Murray-Hall applied to the Superior Court of Quebec for a declaration that ss. 5 and 10 of the Cannabis Regulation Act (which respectively prohibited the possession and cultivation of cannabis plants) was ultra vires provincial jurisdiction, as they fell within the federal criminal law power, or were alternatively of no effect because of federal paramountcy.

== The courts below ==
At first instance, Lavoie J held that the Quebec provisions were constitutionally invalid, because prohibition fell solely under the criminal law power, and thus the double aspect doctrine could not be engaged. The province could act to reduce the number of permissible plants to as low as one, as "[i]t is clear that, other than zero plants, the province could have legislated, either for health or for security". It was not necessary to consider the alternative argument.

The Quebec Court of Appeal set aside the judgment, holding that the double aspect doctrine applied, as "the two levels of government are pursuing parallel objectives within their respective fields of jurisdiction". It further held that federal paramountcy did not apply, as decriminalization does not constitute authorization (which is beyond the scope of the criminal law power).

== At the Supreme Court ==
In a unanimous ruling, the appeal was dismissed. The parties were ordered to bear their own costs throughout. In beginning his analysis, Wagner CJ noted that the appeal raised two questions:

1. Were ss. 5 and 10 constitutionally valid?
2. Were they constitutionally operative?

=== Validity ===
[28] In my view, the pith and substance of the impugned provisions is to ensure the effectiveness of the state monopoly in order to protect the health and security of the public, and of young persons in particular, from cannabis harm. It follows that the prohibitions against the possession of cannabis plants and their cultivation at home set out in ss. 5 and 10 of the provincial Act are a means of serving the public health and security objectives pursued by that Act. With a few slight differences, my conclusion at the characterization stage is the same as that of the Court of Appeal.

He noted that the Court of Appeal made no error in its analysis of their validity, and proceeded to summarize the process in which current constitutional jurisprudence assesses the matter:

1. characterize the law or provisions, through identifying its pith and substance, and only then
2. classify them by reference to the heads of power listed in ss. 91 and 92 of the Constitution Act, 1867

The following principles are followed at the characterization stage:

- The court should begin by characterizing the provisions alone, instead of considering the law as a whole; however, a contextual analysis will be needed when they are part of a regulatory scheme. Reading the provisions being contested in the context of the scheme "is crucial in distinguishing the purpose of the law from the means chosen to achieve it.
- Reviewing the intrinsic evidence of how the Act was drafted will identify whether the provisions in question were a means to achieving the purpose of the scheme. However, it is not up to the court to determine if the provisions themselves are appropriate. "When two approaches are considered to be potentially effective, it falls to legislative bodies to choose the one that is most likely to further the intended objectives."
- Reviewing extrinsic evidence, such as legislative debates, may help in determining whether provisions are colourable in achieving an improper purpose (such as recriminalizing what Parliament had decriminalized), but courts should be careful not to "[express] disapproval of either the policy of the statute or the means by which the legislation seeks to carry it out".

In this case, the purpose of ss. 5 and 10 was "to ensure the effectiveness of the state monopoly in order to protect the health and security of the public from cannabis harm."

In the classification stage, it was noted that, while these provisions seemingly fulfilled the for falling within the criminal law power, Quebec's choice to secure its monopoly on distribution "to protect the health and security of the public" meant that it also fell within provincial jurisdiction under s. 92(13) and (16) of the Constitution Act, 1867. As a result, "[t]his appeal is a textbook case for the application of the double aspect doctrine."

As the appellant failed to prove that ss. 5 and 10 did not fall within provincial jurisdiction, they were held to be a valid exercise of the powers conferred on the National Assembly.

=== Whether operative ===
Turning to the second question on appeal, Wagner CJ noted that Canadian jurisprudence holds that federal paramountcy applies only where there is operational conflict between federal and provincial Acts, or where a federal Act might be frustrated in achieving its purpose. Both parties having conceded that the first scenario was not applicable, the analysis went to whether frustration had occurred.

The appellant had submitted that the decriminalization of possessing or cultivating a limited number of plants meant that Parliament had conferred a positive right for people to do so. This was rejected, as the SCC had previously ruled that an exception "only means that a particular practice is not prohibited, not that the practice is positively allowed by the federal law".

There was no frustration, as both the federal and provincial Acts had a common purpose. It was not for the court to decide which of their approaches would be more effective in dealing with the matter. Therefore, the Quebec provisions were constitutionally operative.

== Impact and aftermath ==
The ruling was seen as conservative, not deviating from current jurisprudence concerning paramountcy, and the SCC rejected the idea that Parliament could ever use the criminal law power to create any positive rights. The Canadian Cancer Society noted that it could also be relevant to substances such as tobacco, e-cigarettes and alcohol.
