= C46 =

C46 or C-46 may refer to:

== Vehicles ==
- Boeing KC-46 Pegasus, an American military tanker aircraft
- Curtiss C-46 Commando, an American transport aircraft
- HMS Trinidad (C46), a Fiji-class light cruiser of the Royal Navy

== Other uses ==
- An Act to amend the Criminal Code (offences relating to conveyances), Bill C-46 of the Parliament of Canada
- C46 road (Namibia)
- Caldwell 46, a variable nebula
- Escadrille C46, a squadron of the French Air Service
- Kaposi's sarcoma
- Three Knights Game, a chess opening
- C46, a 46 minute-long Compact Cassette
