= Cannabis in Quebec =

Map of age of legal cannabis use per province Minimum age is 21 Minimum age is 19 Minimum age is 18

A variation of the flag of Quebec, with the cannabis leaf replacing the fleur-de-lys.

Cannabis in Quebec became legal when the national Cannabis Act went into force on 17 October 2018. Cannabis in Canada has been legal for medicinal purposes since 2001 under conditions outlined in the Marihuana for Medical Purposes Regulations, later superseded by the Access to Cannabis for Medical Purposes Regulations, issued by Health Canada and seed, grain, and fibre production was permitted under licence by Health Canada.

The federal Cannabis Act, legalizing cannabis for recreational use, came into effect on 17 October 2018. Each province and territory set its own laws for various aspects, such as the legal age, whether householders can grow cannabis and the method of retail sales.

== Legalization of recreational marijuana ==
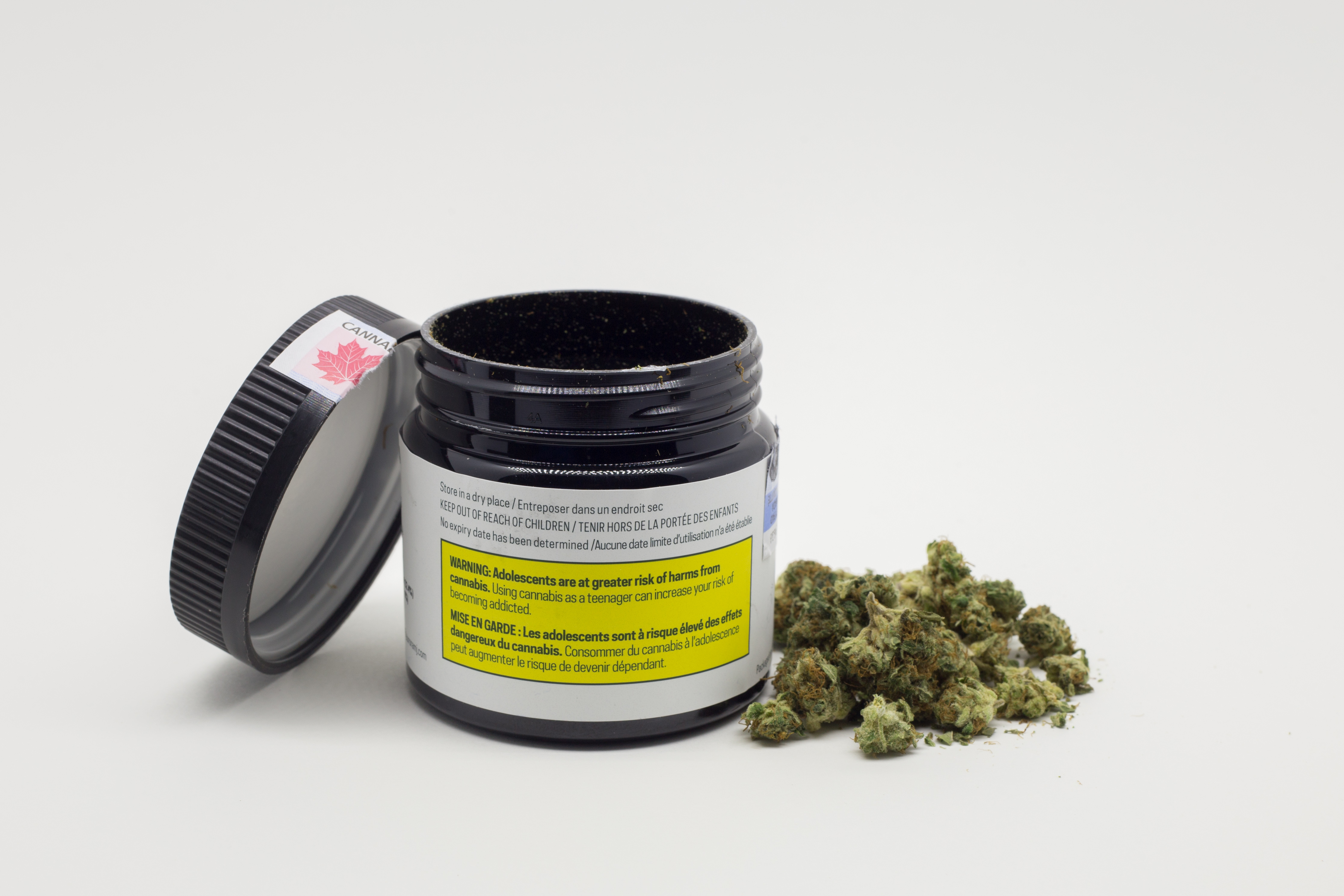
Example of product sold at the SQDC

During the planning stages, the Société québécoise du cannabis was to be the only legal entity to transport or sell cannabis at the retail level. In contrast to the common age minimum of 19 in most provinces, in Quebec the age limit would be 18, later raised to 21. The new government justified increasing the age requirement out of concern for the effects cannabis has on the still-developing brain of young adults under 21. Critics however argue that the law change is unwarranted because those between the ages of 18 and 21 or even through age 25 are the biggest consumers of marijuana and if they are denied access to legal dispensaries they will turn to the unregulated black market. It is also incongruous with the age limit for other legal substances since one needs to be only 18 years of age to buy alcohol, tobacco, and vaping products in Quebec and is the age of majority. Under the newly elected Coalition Avenir Québec government, the Deputy Minister for Health in October 2018, Lionel Carmant announced that the Government will tighten the rules on cannabis consumption, including increasing the legal age to consume to 21 from 18. Home-growing would additionally not be permitted.

Twelve Société québécoise du cannabis stores opened on October 17, 2018; by March 2022, this had increased to 87 retail locations throughout the province. A full 150 different products are sold, in dried, fresh or oil format, but not edibles, as well as accessories such as vaporizers. On-line sales from the SQDC web site also commenced on 17 October. Adults may possess up to 30 grams (1 oz) of dried cannabis, the maximum allowed per purchase, but a full 150 grams (5¼ oz) may be kept in a household, regardless of the number of adult residents. Under Quebec's provincial law, it was originally prohibited to cultivate four cannabis plants for personal use, even though it was permitted by the federal law. However, Murray Hall challenged Quebec's law, and on September 3, 2019, Justice Manon Lavoie deemed that sections 5 and 10 of Quebec's Cannabis Regulation Act were unconstitutional. Quebec's Court of Appeal has sided with the Quebec government. The opposition says they plan to appeal, but as of March 2022 residents of Quebec may not grow cannabis at home. In her ruling, Judge France Thibault wrote that both sides in the case were motivated by the desire to combat the harms associated with consumption. The Quebec government argued they could ban growing cannabis at home in order to protect Quebecers, especially young people. The other side argued that the Quebec government could not overrule federal law that allows Canadians to grow up to four plants per household.

This means that unless the law changes Quebec residents can be fined $750 per plant if found to be growing cannabis, unless they are doing so with a medical authorization through their physician and Health Canada.

Maxime Guérin said he was surprised by the ruling, but that he and his team were prepared to appeal to the Supreme Court and intended on bringing in additional expert legal counsel. They had 60 days to file their appeal, and Guérin said he expected the high court to hear the appeal in about 12–18 months (update: see Murray Hall v. Quebec Public Prosecutor 2019 QCCS 3664 at CanLII).

The consumption of cannabis is heavily restricted; it cannot be used wherever tobacco smoking is prohibited, as well as in a long list of other locations. Some municipalities have restricted smoking in some or all public spaces, but this does not include Montreal. Impairment under the influence of drugs is illegal as it is for drunk driving.

The legal age for the purchase or possession of cannabis in the Province was raised to 21 effective January 1, 2020. Edibles were expected to be sold later in the year, starting with liquids and later, products such as granola bars and muffins. However, on First Nations reserves in Quebec edibles such as gummies, chocolate and muffins can be purchased. The legal age to purchase on a First Nations reserves is still 18.

Following the adoption of the Cannabis Act in 2018, which decriminalized the recreational use of cannabis nationally, the province of Quebec enacted its own law, called the Cannabis Regulation Act, prohibiting possession of a cannabis plant, with fines ranging from $250 to $750. Following the ruling, Janick Murray-Hall challenged the Quebec law, which was then declared unconstitutional in 2019 on the basis that it was a matter for federal jurisdiction, rather than provincial. In 2021, the decision was overturned by the Quebec Court of Appeal, causing Murray-Hall to pursue the Supreme Court. In April 2023, the Supreme Court of Canada ruled in favour of the provincial legislation, deeming Quebec's ban on homegrown cannabis plans to be constitutional.

== Usage ==
In 2013, 11.5 percent of residents reported that they consumed cannabis in the past twelve months, the fifth lowest in the country. In 2017, Statistics Canada reported that the province had the sixth lowest per capita usage in the country of 18.49 grams (2/3 oz) per person.

== See also ==
- Bloc pot
