= 1929 Nova Scotia Government Control of Liquor referendum =

A plebiscite on Nova Scotia's prohibition of alcohol sales was held on October 31, 1929. Voters authorized the repeal of the Nova Scotia Temperance Act. This result opened the door to sales of alcohol in a government monopoly of liquor outlets and created the Nova Scotia Liquor Commission on May 1, 1930.

== Background ==
In August 1927, Premier Edgar Nelson Rhodes stated “Prohibition by statute in my judgement is on all fours with the attitude of the Russian Soviets who believe in rule by force rather than rule by reason”. However, he did not schedule a plebiscite at that time. The provincial election of 1928 resulted in the Conservatives losing their majority of 37 seats and receiving a smaller majority of 3 seats. Two major issues in the campaign were prohibition and old age pensions. After the election, the Royal Commission presented a report which recommended government control of liquor sales as a possible source of revenue for old age pensions. Premier Rhodes then scheduled a plebiscite.

== Plebiscite questions ==
The plebiscite contained two questions.

The first question was as follows:

Are you in favor of continuing the Nova Scotia Temperance Act?

The second question was as follows

Are you in favor of the sale of alcoholic liquor under a government control act?

A majority of people voted yes on each question.

== Results ==
Government control won a decisive victory in the plebiscite, 87,647 to 58,082. It received a majority in every county but six. Only the rural counties of Annapolis, Colchester, Hants, Kings, Queens and Shelburne voted in favour of continuing prohibition.
