= Cannabis in the Northwest Territories =

Map of age of legal cannabis use per province Minimum age is 21 Minimum age is 19 Minimum age is 18

Cannabis in the Northwest Territories became legal when the national Cannabis Act went into force on 17 October 2018.

Cannabis in Canada has been legal for medicinal purposes since 2001 under conditions outlined in the Marihuana for Medical Purposes Regulations, later superseded by the Access to Cannabis for Medical Purposes Regulations, issued by Health Canada and seed, grain, and fibre production was permitted under licence by Health Canada.

The federal Cannabis Act, legalizing cannabis for recreational use, came into effect on 17 October 2018. Each province and territory set its own laws for various aspects, such as the legal age, whether householders can grow cannabis and the method of retail sales.

== Legalization ==
During the planning stages, NWT set the legal age for cannabis use at 19. Smoking cannabis would be allowed on private property, and public smoking will be "restricted in certain areas". The Northwest Territories Liquor Commission will manage all import and distribution of cannabis, through retail outlets and by-mail. Similar to alcohol regulations, communities will be able to hold plebiscites to opt-out of cannabis sales in their jurisdiction.

By mid October 2018, the plan and rules for the NWT had been finalized. A full eight to 10 products are offered and this is expected to increase significantly over time. Initially, five liquor stores were selling marijuana and also bongs and other accessories. The Liquor and Cannabis Commission regulates all cannabis sales in the territory. Online orders from the government web sites can also be made, with the cannabis delivered by Canada Post. Stores operated by private enterprise companies will be licensed in future. There are restrictions as to where marijuana may be smoked.

== Enforcement ==
For the period prior to legalization, NWT has the highest arrest rate for cannabis possession of any province or territory, but convicts arrested possessors at only half the rate of the national average (20% vs. 39%).
