= Cannabis in Yukon =

Map of age of legal cannabis use per province Minimum age is 21 Minimum age is 19 Minimum age is 18

Cannabis in Yukon became legal when the national Cannabis Act went into force on October 17, 2018.

Cannabis in Canada has been legal for medicinal purposes since 2001 under conditions outlined in the Marihuana for Medical Purposes Regulations, later superseded by the Access to Cannabis for Medical Purposes Regulations, issued by Health Canada and seed, grain, and fibre production was permitted under licence by Health Canada.

The federal Cannabis Act, legalizing cannabis for recreational use, came into effect on October 17, 2018. Each province and territory set its own laws for various aspects, such as the legal age, whether householders can grow cannabis, and the method of retail sales.

== Legalization of cannabis for recreational use ==
For Yukon's proposed framework, the territory planned to have one government-owned physical store in the main city of Whitehorse, and online sales to reach more distant communities. The minimum age for cannabis use would be 19.

By October 17, 2018, the Cannabis Yukon store in Whitehorse and the territory's e-commerce retail site were operating. They stocked "over 30 strains and 120 unique products including dried flower, milled flower, pre-rolled, oils and capsules". Product ordered on-line is delivered by Canada Post. The Yukon Liquor Corporation planned to set up a cannabis licensing board by spring 2019 to accept applications from private companies to operate retail stores.
