= Cannabis in Saskatchewan =

Map of age of legal cannabis use per province Minimum age is 21 Minimum age is 19 Minimum age is 18

Cannabis in Saskatchewan became legal when the national Cannabis Act went into force on 17 October 2018.

Cannabis in Canada has been legal for medicinal purposes since 2001 under conditions outlined in the Marihuana for Medical Purposes Regulations, later superseded by the Access to Cannabis for Medical Purposes Regulations, issued by Health Canada, and seed, grain, and fibre production was permitted under licence by Health Canada.

The federal Cannabis Act, legalizing cannabis for recreational use, came into effect on 17 October 2018. Each province and territory set its own laws for various aspects, such as the legal age, whether householders can grow cannabis, and the method of retail sales.

== Industrial cannabis ==
Commercial cultivation of industrial cannabis was banned in Canada in 1938, but as of 1928, 1,640 acres of cannabis were grown in Canada, with 200 of those acres being in Rhein, Saskatchewan.

== Medical cannabis ==
By late 2017, there were at least 10 cannabis storefronts in Regina, ostensibly selling medical cannabis to those with a doctor's note, though one retailer noted that some stores were selling to anyone over the age of 19. The Regina Police Service noted that cannabis dispensaries are illegal nationwide, and clarified: "The fact that we have not laid charges (yet) with respect to marijuana dispensaries in Regina doesn't make them legal."

== Regulations for recreational cannabis ==
After the passing of the federal Cannabis Act, the government of Saskatchewan released a framework for cannabis legalization in March 2018. The Saskatchewan Liquor and Gaming (SLGA) was given the responsibility of overseeing retail and wholesale sales of cannabis, through a permitting process. The framework, quoted below, outlined how the province would regulate distribution, sale and use of cannabis, including the following:

- Minimum age for non-medicinal cannabis consumption will be 19 years of age;
- Zero tolerance for all drug-impaired drivers in the province;
- Consuming cannabis in public spaces will be prohibited for public health considerations. Consumption will also be prohibited in schools and daycares.
- Saskatchewan is introducing legislation to prohibit the possession of any amount by a minor. Possession of smaller amounts, by a minor, will be addressed primarily through ticketing and seizure of the cannabis, in accordance with the provincial Act. Possession of more than five grams will be a criminal offence subject to the Youth Criminal Justice Act.
- The province will adopt the federal minimum standards around home production, including a limit of four plants per household.

By October 2018, the rules and plans Saskatchewan had been finalized. Under provincial cannabis legislation, the minimum legal age for purchase or use is 19, and recreational cannabis may not be consumed in public spaces or in any vehicle; other restrictions apply as to where the product may be consumed. An adult may carry up to 30 grams of cannabis. Driving while impaired is illegal, whether the cannabis is used for medical or recreational purposes. Adults may grow up to four marijuana plants per household for personal use; restrictions may be placed by landlords or condo corporations. Only six cannabis stores were open initially operated by private enterprise companies and licensed by the province.

== Usage ==
In 2013, 10.1 percent of residents reported that they consumed cannabis in the past twelve months, the lowest in the country. In 2017, Statistics Canada reported that the province had the third lowest per capita usage in the country of 16.36 grams per person.
