= Cannabis in New Brunswick =

Map of age of legal cannabis use per province Minimum age is 21 Minimum age is 19 Minimum age is 18

Cannabis in New Brunswick became legal for recreational use when the Cannabis Act went into force across the country on October 17, 2018. The Canadian Alcohol and Drug Use Monitoring Survey of 2012 noted that New Brunswick had the lowest proportion of people reporting past-year cannabis use of any Canadian province, at 8.5%.

== History ==
=== Cannabis café ===
In 2003, Saint John Cannabis Café opened in Saint John, New Brunswick to provide medical cannabis. Though the business was technically illegal, the police did not interfere, even when the cafe moved to a larger location across from a police station. Customers were required to attest that they suffered from one of 300 qualifying medical conditions, in order to purchase. The owner stated that 200 people per day made purchases at the store, with many more "just looking", and that a number of customers were from the cruise ships that dock at Saint John.

=== Tobique First Nation raid ===
In October 2016, the medical cannabis dispensary on the Tobique First Nation reserve in New Brunswick was raided by the Royal Canadian Mounted Police. The dispensary was illegal under national law, but was approved by the band council, causing a disjunct and raising issues of tribal sovereignty. The community reacted with anger to the raid, with 50 members forming a blockade to prevent RCMP officers from leaving. The manager of the dispensary stated to news media: "Our laws, our laws... Your laws, your laws."

== Legalization for recreational use ==
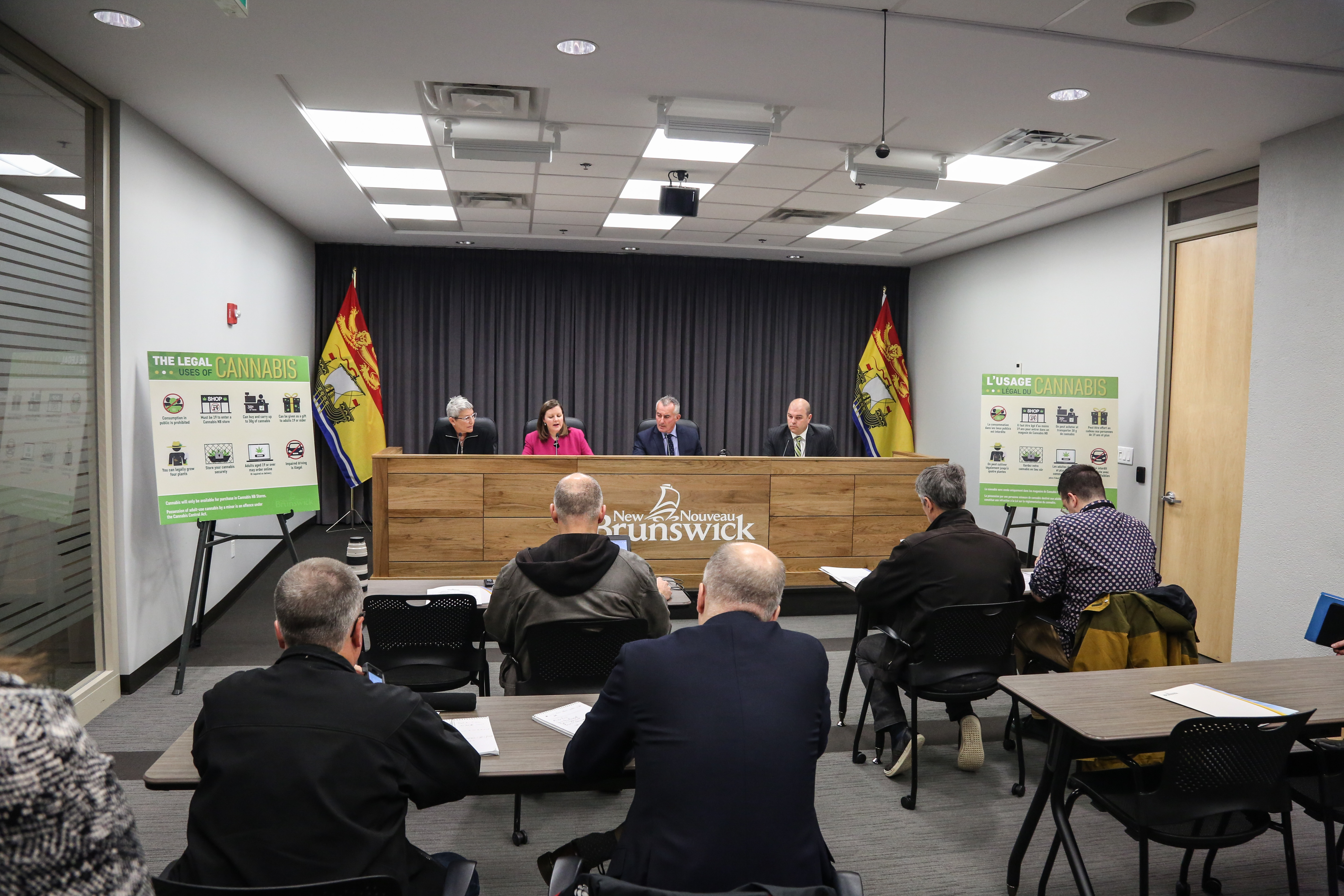
A meeting in October 2018 reminding the public of the legal rules and legal uses of cannabis in New Brunswick

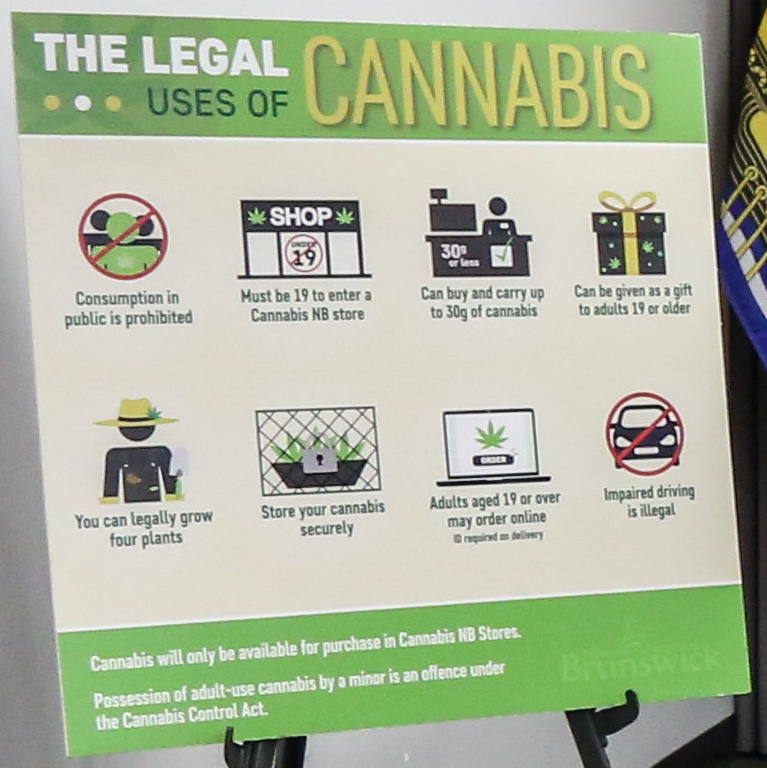
A close-up of a board at the above meeting displaying the legal uses of cannabis in New Brunswick

Cannabis in Canada has been legal for medicinal purposes since 2001 under conditions outlined in the Marihuana for Medical Purposes Regulations, later superseded by the Access to Cannabis for Medical Purposes Regulations, issued by Health Canada and seed, grain, and fibre production was permitted under licence by Health Canada.

The federal Cannabis Act, legalizing cannabis for recreational use, came into effect on October 17, 2018. Each province and territory set its own laws for various aspects, such as the legal age, whether householders can grow cannabis and the method of retail sales.

In 2017 the New Brunswick provincial government announced that crown-run NB Liquor would take charge of opening up to 20 cannabis stores in the province. Proposed new laws in the province included limiting adults to carrying 30 grams of cannabis (with no limit inside the home), and requiring that cannabis in the home be stored in a locked container or room. Smoking cannabis would be banned in public places.

All of the plans and rules had been finalized for New Brunswick by early October 2018. (The rules for medical cannabis were not modified in any way.) The minimum age to use, buy, grow or possess cannabis for recreational use is 19. Cannabis must not be consumed in a public place or in a motor vehicle, whether it's moving or not. Adults may buy up to 30 grams of cannabis from a Cannabis NB retail store, and possess no more than this amount in public, but there is no limit on the amount that may be possessed at an adult's home. Hotels and campgrounds can restrict the smoking and vaping of cannabis but not ban other methods of consumption. A household may grow up to four plants. Purchases may be made only through Cannabis NB, whether a store or e-commerce site; no advertising of the product is allowed.

== Usage ==
In 2013, 11 percent of residents reported that they consumed cannabis in the past twelve months, the third lowest in the country. In 2017, Statistics Canada reported that the province had the fifth highest per capita usage in the country of 20.46 grams per person.

== Privatization ==
On November 14, 2019, Finance Minister Ernie Steeves announced that due to a continually losing money since opening, the government has issued an RFP to find a private operator to take over Cannabis NB.
