= Société québécoise du cannabis =

Cannabis sales monopoly and Crown corporation of Quebec, Canada

Société québécoise du cannabis Quebec Cannabis Corporation
- Type: Crown Corporation
- Industry: Retail
- Founded: 2017
- Headquarters: 7355, rue Notre-Dame Est; Montreal, Quebec; H1N 3S7,
- Products: Recreational cannabis products
- Owner: Government of Quebec
- Parent: Société des alcools du Québec
- Website: www.sqdc.ca

The Société québécoise du cannabis (SQDC; lit. Quebec Cannabis Corporation) is the Crown corporation which operates the legal monopoly on recreational cannabis sales in the Canadian province of Quebec.

SQDC is incorporated as a subsidiary of the Société des alcools du Québec (SAQ). It was tabled in the National Assembly of Quebec on November 16, 2017, and was officially adopted on June 12, 2018.

== Financing ==
Under the Act respecting the Société des alcools du Québec, the SQDC's revenues from the sale of cannabis must be used for the following purposes:

- The elimination of any deficit that the SQDC may incur;
- The transfer to be made by the Minister of Finance each year to the Cannabis Prevention and Research Fund, and also the prevention of the use of psychoactive substances, as well as the fight against related harms.

== See also ==
- Cannabis in Quebec
- BC Cannabis Stores
