= Cannabis in Manitoba =

Law in Manitoba concerning use of cannabis

Map of age of legal cannabis use per province Minimum age is 21 Minimum age is 19 Minimum age is 18

Non-medical cannabis in Manitoba became legal when the national Cannabis Act went into force on October 17, 2018.

Today, recreational cannabis is a controlled substance in Manitoba, with a hybrid retail and distribution model wherein it is provincially-controlled but sold by private retail outlets. The regulation of cannabis in Manitoba is the responsibility of the Liquor, Gaming and Cannabis Authority of Manitoba (LGCA), who is the sole licenser of retail cannabis stores and distributors in the province.

The minimum age is 19; cannabis must not be smoked or vaped in public; home growing is not legal; and individuals may carry up to 30 grams (1.1 oz) of cannabis while in public.

== History ==
Commercial cultivation of industrial cannabis was banned in Canada in 1938.

In December 2017, Manitoba introduced the Safe and Responsible Retailing of Cannabis Act, which received royal assent on June 4, 2018, detailing their plans for recreational cannabis use and sales. The Act amended The Liquor and Gaming Control Act and The Manitoba Liquor and Lotteries Corporation Act to authorize and regulate the retail sale of cannabis in Manitoba—once such sales are legalized by the federal government.

Under the Act, the age for use would be set at 19, and municipalities would be allowed to opt-out of the sale of cannabis via plebiscite. Home-growing of cannabis would be prohibited. Manitoba Liquor & Lotteries would source all cannabis to retailers, where it would be sold in private-sector stores.

On October 17, 2018, the national Cannabis Act came into force along with the provincial Liquor, Gaming and Cannabis Control Act. The provincial legislation established the framework for Manitoba's cannabis retail model and added the regulation of cannabis stores and distributors to the Liquor and Gaming Authority of Manitoba's responsibilities, thereby renaming the LGA to the Liquor, Gaming and Cannabis Authority of Manitoba (LGCA).

On October 17, 2019, the federal government legalized the sale of edibles and concentrates. At the same time, Manitoba Premier Brian Pallister announced plans to ban consumption of edibles in public in Manitoba by December.

== Regulation ==
In regards to cannabis, the Government of Manitoba has full authority over regulating workplace safety, distribution and wholesaling, the retail model, retail locations and rules, and regulatory compliance. The federal government, on the other hand, has complete responsibility over regulating medical cannabis, as well as trafficking, advertisement and packaging, and cultivation and processing of cannabis. The regulation of public consumption comes down to both the province and its municipalities, while land use and zoning is strictly a municipal matter.

Non-medical cannabis may be sold only by those with a retail cannabis license, which allows the sale of cannabis at the location specified in the particular license as well as through online sales. All retail cannabis stores and distributors in Manitoba are licensed by the Liquor, Gaming and Cannabis Authority of Manitoba (LGCA). Licensed stores can only sell cannabis that has been grown by producers authorized by the federal government.

Manitoba Liquor & Lotteries Corp. (MLLC) is responsible for sourcing and distributing non-medical cannabis to retailers in Manitoba, and all cannabis at cannabis stores must have been purchased from MLLC.

In Manitoba, the minimum age is 19; cannabis must not be smoked or vaped in public; home growing is not legal; and individuals may carry up to 30 grams (1.1 oz) of cannabis while in public. Purchases can be made online or in-person at provincially-licensed private retail stores.

=== Legislation ===
The following legislation dictate all primary matters related to cannabis in Manitoba:

- Cannabis Act (federal) — national legalization
- The Liquor, Gaming and Cannabis Control Act and The Manitoba Liquor and Lotteries Corporation Act — provincial licensing, purchasing, and regulation
- The Safe and Responsible Retailing of Cannabis Act — cannabis retailing
- The Cannabis Harm Prevention Act (Bill 25) — amends several provincial legislation to address health or safety matters related to cannabis consumption
- The Smoking and Vapour Products Control Act — provincial public smoking legislation as it related to cannabis

The following are legislation that were amended by The Cannabis Harm Prevention Act to address health or safety matters related to cannabis consumption:

- The Highway Traffic Act — amended to include traffic regulations related to cannabis use. The Act now includes restrictions on the transportation of cannabis in motorized vehicles; prohibition of the consumption of cannabis in motorized vehicles on a highway; and a 24-hour roadside suspension when an officer reasonably believes that a person is driving under the influence of cannabis
- The Child Sexual Exploitation and Human Trafficking Act — amended to expressly state cannabis as a controlled substance. This allows the Act to continue applying to those who supply "cannabis in exchange for sexual conduct with a child or in order to compel victims of human trafficking to engage in specified activities."
- The Mental Health Act — amended to expressly list cannabis as an intoxicant. As result, the prohibition on providing intoxicants to residents in a mental health facility still applies to cannabis.
- The Non-Smokers Health Protection Act — amended to prohibit people from smoking cannabis in enclosed public places, including through the use of e-cigarettes.
- The Off-Road Vehicles Act — amended to create similar transportation and consumption prohibitions for off-road vehicles as those added for vehicles under The Highway Traffic Act.
- The Public Schools Act — amended to require schools to specifically add cannabis to the list of prohibited products under their student codes of conduct (which schools are mandated to have).

== First Nations ==
First Nations in Manitoba are beholden to the same the rules and licensing requirements as non-medical cannabis retailers.

In 2016, six Manitoba First Nations entered into formal partnerships and investment arrangements with companies selected as provincial cannabis retailers. The following First Nations were among the first communities in Manitoba to have a non-medical retail cannabis store on or after October 17, 2018: Waywayseecappo First Nation, Nisichawayasihk Cree Nation, Long Plain First Nation, Opaskwayak Cree Nation, Peguis First Nation, and Brokenhead Ojibway Nation.

In 2017, Opaskwayak, Long Plain FN, and Peguis FN formed an alliance with National Access Cannabis to help establish a cannabis distribution network in the province. This would help gain profit for their communities from legalization, and lobby for their interests on issues such as tax rebates for cannabis sold on reserves.

== Industrial hemp ==
Commercial cultivation of industrial cannabis was banned in Canada in 1938, but as of 1928 1,640 acres of cannabis were grown in Canada, with 1,200 of those acres being in Portage la Prairie, Manitoba.

== Usage ==
In 2013, 11.5% of residents reported that they consumed cannabis in the past twelve months, the fifth highest in the country. In 2017, Statistics Canada reported that the province had the fifth lowest per capita usage in the country of 18.31 grams per person.

== See also ==
- Cannabis in Canada
