= Cannabis in Alberta =

Map of age of legal cannabis use per province Minimum age is 21 Minimum age is 19 Minimum age is 18

Cannabis in Alberta became legalized on October 17, 2018 following the coming into force of federal Bill C-45. Production, distribution and consumption of cannabis had been prohibited in Canada since 1923. While some other provinces distribute cannabis through publicly owned retail monopolies, Alberta allows private companies to sell cannabis at licensed retail storefronts and online. Private retailers must purchase cannabis from the provincial wholesaler, the AGLC. Originally, the Alberta government was the sole entity permitted to retail cannabis online within the province but as of March 8, 2022, private retailers are permitted to do so and the province has since exited the retail business.

In contrast with slow rollouts in provinces such as Ontario, which initially utilized a lottery system to distribute retail licences, Alberta had no restrictions on the number of licences issued and had the most cannabis dispensaries per capita in Canada soon after legalization. The province's successful implementation of legalization led to some outlets describing it as the "pot capital of Canada."

== Legalization for recreational use ==
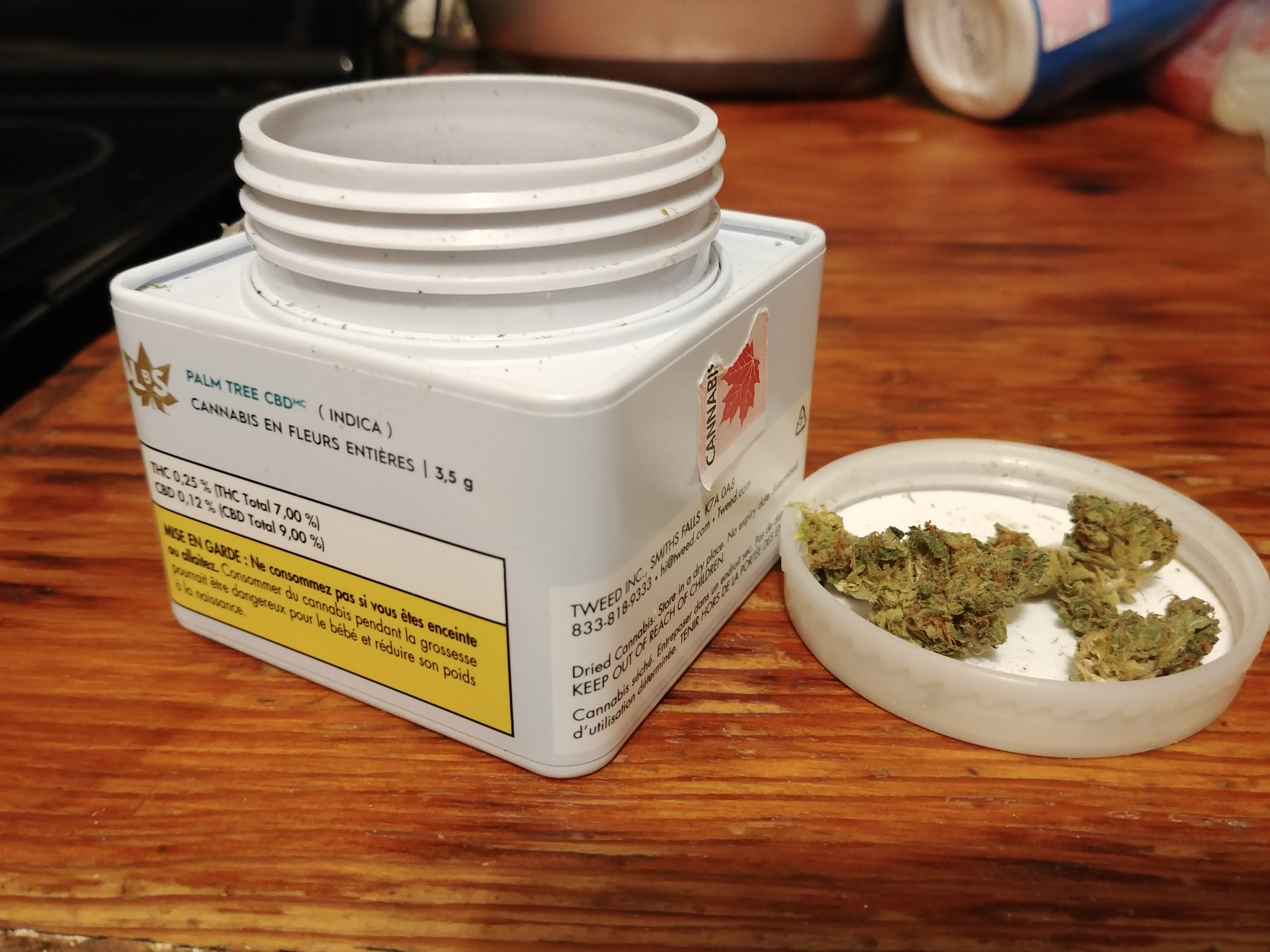
Canopy Growth Corporation's Tweed-branded cannabis as sold in Alberta

The minimum age for recreational use of marijuana is 18 (the same age one can purchase alcohol and tobacco and is the age of majority). Those under that age will not be allowed to enter retail cannabis stores (even if with an adult) and there is a zero-tolerance policy for minors purchasing, possessing, or consuming marijuana. Minors caught not in compliance with the zero-tolerance policy will face penalties but the severity of those penalties depends on how many ounces are on their person. Youth who are least 12 years old, but less than 18 who possess 5 grams or less will not be charged criminally but will be subject to other disciplinary actions such as the seizure of the cannabis, notification of parents or guardians, and possible fines. Those who possess more than 5 grams can be charged under the Youth Criminal Justice Act and will face additional sanctions. Those who provide marijuana to persons under 18 can be punished by receiving a $5,000 fine and/or up to 14 years in jail. The restriction on minors is for recreational marijuana, there may be exceptions for case-by-case medical use.

Sales are made at private enterprise stores licensed by Alberta Gaming, Liquor and Cannabis or from the government's web site. Retail stores licensed to sell cannabis must not also sell alcohol, tobacco or pharmaceuticals. The products that were initially available included dried flower, milled flower, plant seeds, oil, capsules and pre-rolls. Edibles, concentrates and topicals became legal to sell 1 year later in October 2019. The rules as to where cannabis can be consumed vary from city to city, but typically, Albertans can do so in their homes and in some public spaces where cigarette smoking is allowed, but cannabis use is banned in cars. Specific laws about driving under the influence of cannabis are in place. Amendments to the Gaming, Liquor and Cannabis Act enabled cannabis licensed retailers to sell cannabis online and provide delivery, starting on Mar. 8. 2022. At the same time, the AGLC withdrew from the online cannabis retail business that was previously accessible through AlbertaCannabis.org.

== Canadian Cannabis Chamber ==
The national Canadian Cannabis Chamber is based in Alberta, and is staffed by Jonathan Denis, the province's former Justice Minister, and Rick Hanson, the former police chief of the province's largest city, Calgary.

== Industrial hemp ==
Hemp production was legalized in 1998 and Alberta grew thousands of acres by the 2000s. In 2011, Alberta grew 6,434 hectares (15,900 acres), about 40% of Canada's hemp and 40% of the nation's hemp seed. Alberta is generally arid and hemp is grown under irrigation. In 2013, the cultivars in use were from Europe, with experiments with new cultivars suited to prairie climate (X59, CFX-2, CRS-1, Silesia, Canada, and Delores) underway at locations in Canada including Alberta. In 2014, the Finola cultivar, a Finnish cultivar accounting for a third of national production, dominated Alberta's production at 7,400 hectares (18,000 acres).

== Usage ==
In 2013, 11.8 percent of residents reported that they consumed cannabis in the past twelve months, the fourth highest in the country. In 2017, Statistics Canada reported that the province had the third highest per capita usage in the country of 24.08 grams per person.
