= Nova Scotia Liquor Corporation =

Canadian provincial Crown corporation

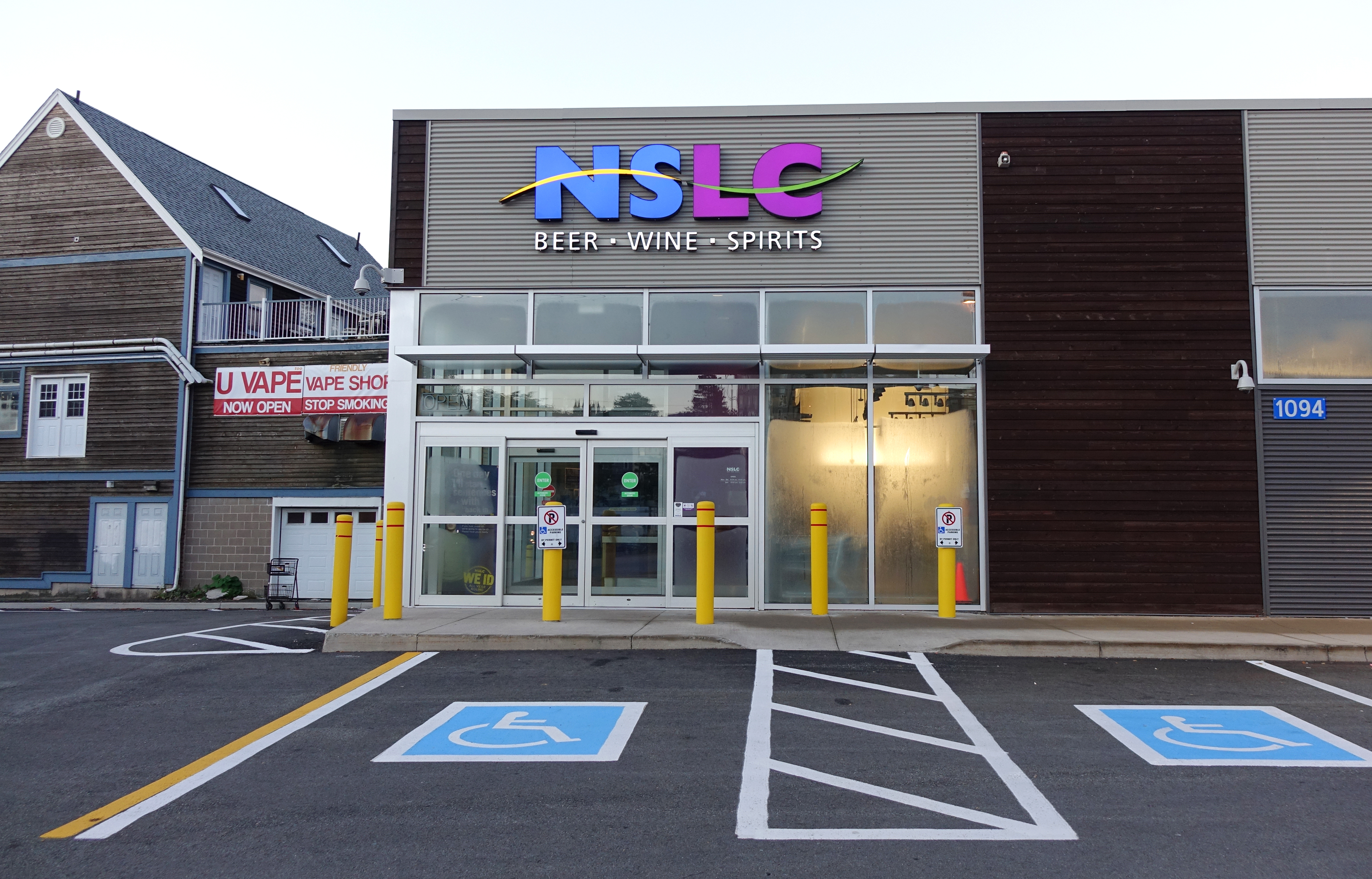
- Typical NSLC store in the South End of Halifax in 2018, before legalization of cannabis
- Type: Crown corporation
- Industry: Retail (department & discount)
- Founded: May 1, 1930
- Headquarters: Halifax, Nova Scotia
- Products: Beverage alcohol, cannabis (selected outlets)
- Revenue: ▲ approx: $239.2 million CAD
- Website: http://www.myNSLC.com

The Nova Scotia Liquor Corporation (NSLC) is the Crown corporation which controls sales of alcoholic beverages and recreational cannabis in Nova Scotia, Canada. It is the sole distributor for these products and runs all retail outlets (108 across the province) selling alcohol and cannabis products. The exceptions are for four private retailers in urban HRM offering beer, wine, and spirits, and, in rural areas where there is not an NSLC location, 65 "agency" liquor stores operated by private retailers on NSLC's behalf.

== History ==
In 1910 the Nova Scotia Temperance Act was passed which enforced prohibition of alcohol sales throughout the province except in Halifax. Beginning in 1916, alcohol sales were prohibited in Halifax.

On October 31, 1929, a plebiscite was held on Nova Scotia's prohibition of alcohol sales. Over 60 percent of voters authorized the repeal of the Temperance Act, making Nova Scotia the second last province in Canada to end prohibition.

On May 1, 1930 the Nova Scotia Liquor Commission was created through legislation passed as the Liquor Control Act.

In 1946, the responsibility for licensing sites selling alcoholic beverages (e.g. bars and restaurants) was transferred to the Tavern Licence Committee (now named Liquor License Board).

The liquor commission's current head office and distribution centre was constructed in the Bayers Lake Industrial Park in 1987.

In 1995, the Gaming Control Act made the Nova Scotia Liquor Commission part of the Alcohol and Gaming Authority.

In July 2001, the organization was changed from a commission to a Crown corporation and renamed the Nova Scotia Liquor Corporation.

On December 1, 2004, the organization unveiled a new retail logo, replacing their old "Liquor Store" logo.

On October 17, 2018, the Nova Scotia Liquor Corporation became the sole authorized retailer of cannabis in Nova Scotia following the legalization of recreational cannabis.

During the 2025 United States trade war with Canada and Mexico, the NSLC removed all American products from shelves twice as a non-tariff retaliatory measure, first in February during the initial tariff threats from the US, and then again in March when the delayed tariffs on Canadian goods took effect.
