= Cannabis Act (Canada) =

2018 Canadian law legalizing recreational cannabis use

Parliament of Canada
- Long title: An Act respecting cannabis and to amend the Controlled Drugs and Substances Act, the Criminal Code and other Acts
- Passed by: House of Commons
- Passed: June 19, 2018
- Enacted by: Senate
- Royal assent: June 21, 2018
- Effective: October 17, 2018

Legislative history

Initiating chamber: House of Commons
- Bill citation: Bill C-45
- Introduced by: Jody Wilson-Raybould, Minister of Justice
- First reading: April 13, 2017
- Second reading: June 8, 2017
- Third reading: November 27, 2017
- Committee report: Report 12

Revising chamber: Senate
- Bill title: C-45
- First reading: November 28, 2017
- Second reading: March 22, 2018
- Third reading: June 7, 2018
- Status: In force

The Cannabis Act (Note: Full title: An Act respecting cannabis and to amend the Controlled Drugs and Substances Act, the Criminal Code and other Acts) (French: Loi sur le cannabis, also known as Bill C-45) is a law which legalized recreational cannabis use in Canada in combination with its companion legislation Bill C-46, An Act to Amend the Criminal Code. The law is a milestone in the legal history of cannabis in Canada, alongside the 1923 prohibition.

The bill was passed by the House of Commons in late November 2017, and in the Senate on June 7, 2018, and the House accepted some Senate amendments and sent the bill back to the Senate on June 18. The Senate then passed the final version of the bill on June 19, and it received Royal Assent on June 21. Canada is the second country in the world to legalize recreational cannabis nationwide after Uruguay.

== History leading up to act ==
The Liberal Party proposed legalization in 2012, and it was a major campaign platform for Justin Trudeau who became Prime Minister in 2015. Shortly after election, the Task Force on Cannabis Legalization and Regulation was convened to study the issue. They released a report on December 13, 2016. On April 10, 2017, CBC News and sources in other countries reported that the Liberals intended to table legislation by April 13, in time for it to be considered prior to the 420 "holiday". A legalization date prior to July 1, 2018, was set to avoid Canada Day. Canadian policy makers considered regulations and laws around legalized cannabis in Colorado, Washington and Uruguay as a model.

== Act and its provisions ==
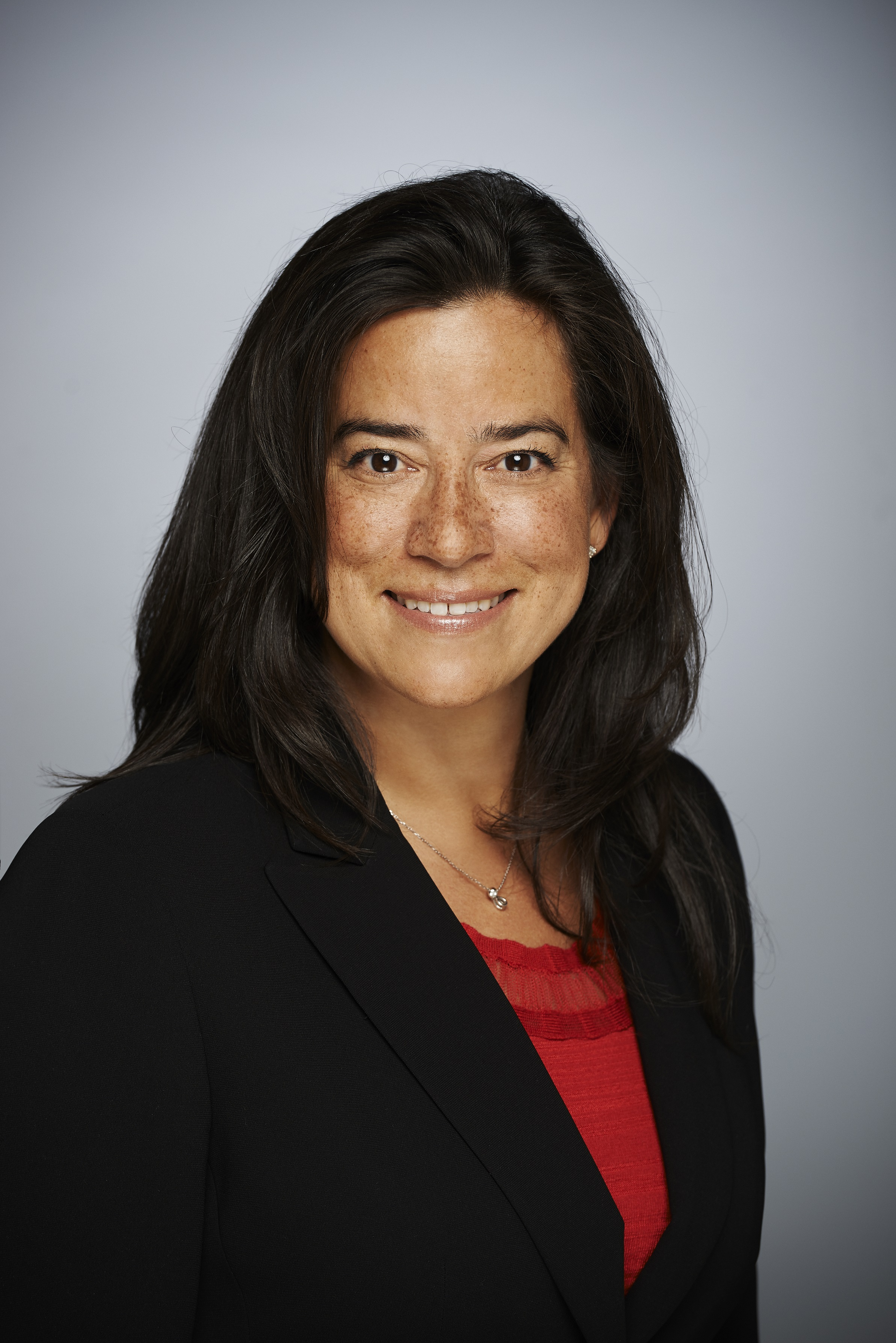
The bill was sponsored by Justice Minister Jody Wilson-Raybould (pictured in 2014).

Map showing which MP's voted in favour or against the Act by party affiliation

Map showing which MP's voted in favour (green), against (red), abstained (grey) or whether the seat was vacant (black)

On April 13, 2017, Bill C-45, with the short title Cannabis Act, was introduced to Parliament, sponsored by Jody Wilson-Raybould, Minister of Justice and Attorney General of Canada. It allowed for national use by individuals aged 18 and over, and possession of 30 grams. Provinces may further restrict possession, sale and use. Legal sales take place at retail outlets or through the mail. The provinces are responsible for setting up a system for retail sales. Mail delivery will be handled by the federal government. The bill was said on April 14, 2017, to have a solid majority of support from the governing Liberal Party and the opposition Conservative and New Democratic parties.

Personal production: Individuals are permitted to grow up to four plants for their own use. While the sale of edibles (baked goods, drinks, etc.) will not be allowed initially, individuals can make edibles at home for their own use.

Promotion and packaging: Companies are allowed to brand their products, but they must avoid anything that would appear to appeal directly to youth such as cartoon characters, animals, or celebrity endorsements. Event sponsorship is also not allowed. Companies can also use factual information on their packaging, such as THC levels, that would help consumers make a decision on what product to buy. Promotion is only allowed in places where youth cannot view it.

=== Revenue projections ===
Tax revenue to the national treasury was projected in 2017 to be upwards of $675 million a year.

== Reactions ==
National legalization of cannabis north of the Canada–United States border is expected to create a competitive pressure for the United States to legalize at the federal level, lest consumers divert billions of dollars of revenue outside the country.

Many were disappointed that the legislation did not contain plans to expunge the criminal records of persons charged with simple possession. This means that anyone with a record for possessing under 30 grams will still need to petition a Record Suspension after a five-year waiting period. This led some activists to believe that the legalization is not "true legalization" and does not help people who come from disadvantaged backgrounds.

A satirical reaction in The Beaverton, an online Canadian publication, said that legalization would make cannabis "shittier and harder to get" in a country where it is already plentiful. Canoe.com editorialized that the bill was rushed and failed to address concerns of the black market and did not set limits for legal impairment for motor vehicle operators.

During the Lac St. Jean byelection, the debate over legalization was an issue. The Bloc Québécois candidate Marc Maltais expressed concerns over the bill's ability to respect provincial jurisdiction. The NDP candidate felt that the July 1 deadline was too fast for legalization to be implemented.

A lawyer said that the ticketing provision in the Act could likely "violate the Canadian Charter of Rights and Freedoms."

=== Final implementation ===
After being passed by the House of Commons, the bill was sent to the Senate. On June 1, 2018, the Senate passed an amendment to C-45 outlawing cannabis "brand-stretching". The amendment, which passed 34–28, outlaws the sale and display of cannabis-related merchandise and makes it difficult to publicly promote cannabis once legalized. However, this amendment was rejected by the Liberal government when the bill was returned to the House of Commons and does not appear in the final version of C-45 that received Royal Assent.

On June 19, 2018, the Senate passed the bill and the prime minister announced the effective legalization date as October 17, 2018. Canada is the second country (after Uruguay) to legalize the drug.

As expected, the use of cannabis for recreational purposes became legal across the country on October 17, 2018, under the Cannabis Act. Persons aged 18 or older can possess up to 30 grams of dried or “equivalent non-dried form” in public. Adults are also allowed to make cannabis-infused food and drinks "as long as organic solvents are not used to create concentrated products." Each household is allowed to grow up to four cannabis plants from "licensed seed or seedlings". In response, the National Assembly of Quebec passed legislation that created a provincial monopoly on the sale of cannabis, as well as prohibiting the possession of cannabis plants and their cultivation for personal purposes in a dwelling‑house. (Note: An Act to constitute the Société québécoise du cannabis, to enact the Cannabis Regulation Act and to amend various highway safety-related provisions, L.Q. 2018, c. 19 , of which Part II enacted the Cannabis Regulation Act.) The Legislative Assembly of Manitoba passed similar legislation. (Note: The Liquor, Gaming and Cannabis Control Act, CCSM , c. L153 , as enacted by The Safe and Responsible Retailing of Cannabis Act (Liquor and Gaming Control Act and Manitoba Liquor and Lotteries Corporation Act Amended), S.M. 2018, c. 9) In April 2023, the Supreme Court of Canada ruled in Murray‑Hall v Quebec (Attorney General) that such measures were a valid exercise of provincial jurisdiction.

Each province set its own procedures for retail sales, and these vary as to the ownership of retail stores (government or private enterprise) but all provinces decided to offer an option for online sales.

Since cannabis is illegal in the U.S. per federal legislation, the government warned that "previous use of cannabis, or any substance prohibited by U.S. federal laws, could mean that you are denied entry to the U.S". Canadians travelling within the country (but not internationally) are allowed to carry up to 30 grams of cannabis. Driving under the influence of drugs remained illegal.

== Effect ==
By 2022, the cannabis industry in Canada has contributed $43.5 billion to Canada's GDP, according to Deloitte Canada. It has also created 98,000 jobs and paid over $15 billion in taxes.

== See also ==
- Cannabis in Canada

By province or territory:

- Alberta
- British Columbia
- Manitoba
- New Brunswick
- Newfoundland and Labrador
- Northwest Territories
- Nova Scotia
- Nunavut
- Ontario
- Prince Edward Island
- Quebec
- Saskatchewan
- Yukon
- Canadian Indian reserves
