= An Act to amend the Criminal Code (offences relating to conveyances) =

2018 Canadian law

Parliament of Canada
- Long title: An Act to amend the Criminal Code (offences relating to conveyances) and to make consequential amendments to other Acts
- Citation: S.C. 2018, c. 21
- Enacted by: Parliament of Canada
- Royal assent: June 21, 2018

Legislative history
- Bill title: C-46
- Introduced by: Jody Wilson-Raybould, Minister of Justice
- First reading: April 13, 2017
- Second reading: May 31, 2017
- Third reading: October 31, 2017
- Bill title: C-46
- First reading: November 1, 2017
- Second reading: December 14, 2017
- Third reading: June 14, 2018
- Status: In force

An Act to amend the Criminal Code (offences relating to conveyances) and to make consequential amendments to other Acts (French: Loi modifiant le Code criminel (infractions relatives aux moyens de transport) et apportant des modifications corrélatives à d’autres lois), also known as Bill C-46, is an act of the Parliament of Canada that was introduced in the House of Commons by Minister of Justice Jody Wilson-Raybould in 2017, alongside the Cannabis Act. The act amended the Criminal Code to increase police powers related to impaired driving, including authorizing mandatory alcohol screening, without suspicion that the person is impaired. It also increased the maximum punishments for driving related offences in the Criminal Code.

== Provisions ==
The act creates a criminal offence related to the concentration of a drug in a person's blood while driving, specific blood concentration levels that would be illegal would be prescribed in regulations by the Governor in Council. If a peace officer suspects that a person has operated a vehicle under the influence of a drug, they would be authorized to order that person to provide a sample of a "bodily substance". The act would further allow a peace officers to demand that a person provide a breath sample, in order to screen for alcohol impairment, without suspicion that the person is impaired.

The act also increases the punishments for driving-related offences. The maximum punishment for offences causing bodily harm would increase from 10 years to 14 years, and offences causing death would increase from 14 years to life in prison. Dangerous driving, failure to stop after an accident, and flight from a peace officer would also see increased maximum sentences—doubling from 5 years to 10 years in prison.

== Reception ==
The provisions of the act related to alcohol screening have been the subject of debate in the legal community. Rob De Luca of the Canadian Civil Liberties Association argued in the Toronto Star that the change would be "a fundamental and troubling change in our legal system [...] the presumption of innocence is replaced with a presumption of guilt", Kathryn Pentz of the Canadian Bar Association argued that it would violate section 8 of the Canadian Charter of Rights and Freedoms and "that it would not withstand constitutional challenge", Senator Serge Joyal argued that it would violate section 9 and 10(b) of the Canadian Charter of Rights and Freedoms. On the other side of the debate, it has been argued that the change is necessary, reasonable and constitutional. Among the supporters of the act are legal scholars Peter Hogg and Marc Gold. Canada's Privacy Commissioner stated that the act "strikes the appropriate balance from a privacy perspective" and that the government "has made a reasonable case for the necessity and proportionality" of mandatory screening. Among the general public, according to a poll by Nanos Research, 44 percent of respondents support mandatory alcohol screening, while 55 percent oppose it.

Senators Murray Sinclair and Renée Dupuis raised concerns that the act would worsen racial profiling. Sinclair suggested the use of body cameras and record keeping by officers, in order to better monitor police behaviour. Jody Wilson-Raybould responded to concerns by stating that the act "does not change the responsibility that law enforcement has to ensure fair and equal application of the law." An official from the Department of Justice noted that the Minister of Justice would be required to prepare a report on the legislation's success three years after it is passed, and suggested that racial profiling could be reduced through police training.

Concerns have also been raised with regard to the effectiveness of drug screening methods, and possible negative effects the act could have on medical marijuana users. The concerns focus on the length of time THC stays in the body, possibly for days after use, which critics believe could lead to arrests of people who aren't impaired. Jody Wilson-Raybould argued that requiring police officers to have suspicion of impairment, before screening, would serve as "inherent protection to avoid charging drivers who were not actually impaired," and that the screening methods "are consistent with the approach taken in other jurisdictions." Critics have argued that the smell of marijuana in a vehicle could lead an officer to suspect impairment, regardless of whether it has been used by the driver, therefore leading to the requirement being ineffective.

Serge Joyal raised concerns that the act would create additional court challenges and complications, and would not reduce litigation and delays, in the frequently litigated fields of drug-impaired and drunk driving.
