= Access to Cannabis for Medical Purposes Regulations =

The Access to Cannabis for Medical Purposes Regulations (French: Règlement sur l'accès au cannabis à des fins médicales, ACMPR) are a set of Canadian regulations enacted by Health Canada in August 2016 concerning the production, distribution, personal cultivation and use of medical cannabis.

Medical cannabis was first legalized in Canada and regulated under the "Marihuana Medical Access Regulations" (MMAR), which came into force on 30 July 2001. The MMAR program was intended to clearly define the circumstances and the manner in which access to cannabis for medical purposes would be permitted. It contained three main components: authorizations to possess dried cannabis flowers; licences to produce dried cannabis flowers, which include Personal-Use Production Licences and Designated-Person Production Licences; and access to supply of cannabis seeds or dried cannabis flowers.

Prior to a federal injunction, the MMAR program was scheduled to end on March 31, 2014, and in response, Health Canada proposed a new set of regulations called the "Marihuana for Medical Purposes Regulations" (MMPR) in response to concerns from stakeholders that the MMAR was open to abuse. The MMPR treated cannabis as much as possible like any other narcotic used for medical purposes by creating conditions for a new, commercial industry that is responsible for its production and distribution. According to a statement from Health Canada at the time, the regulations "will provide access to quality-controlled marihuana for medical purposes, produced under secure and sanitary conditions, to those Canadians who need it, while strengthening the safety of Canadian communities. In addition, the new regulations will also enable more choices of marihuana strains and licensed, commercial suppliers." Portions of the regulations become effective on October 1, 2013, March 31, 2014, and March 31, 2015. While the MMPR originally only contemplated the sale of dried cannabis flowers, amendments eventually allowed patients to turn their cannabis into products such as edibles and cannabis oil.

The transition from the MMAR to the MMPR program represented a substantial change in direction for the supply and acquisition of medical cannabis in Canada and it did not go without controversy. The MMAR DPL/PPL Coalition Against Repeal was a coalition of over 6,000 members fighting for the preservation of the MMAR. An exemption was granted by a Federal Court Judge in British Columbia and permitted clients who had a valid authorization to possess and/or a production license as of March 21, 2014 to continue to grow until the outcome of a Constitutional Challenge Trial that started in February 2015. The court challenge resulted in the MMAR regulations getting struck down as unconstitutional due to the inability for patients to grow their own medicine.

In August 2016, Health Canada announced the current ACMPR to replace MMPR. The new program incorporates the MMPR with a new personal cultivation regime similar to the former MMAR. Under the ACMPR, Health Canada maintains a list of authorized licensed producers of medical cannabis.
