= BDL (disambiguation) =

Bradley International Airport (IATA: BDL) is an airport in the United States.

BDL may also refer to:

- Banque du Liban, a Lebanese central bank
- Bharat Dynamics Limited, an Indian defense company
- Brewers' Distributor, a Canadian beer distributor
