= Canadian provincial liquor cards =

Liquor-control agencies in some Canadian provinces have produced age-of-majority ID cards to facilitate the purchase of alcohol by Canadian adults. Only one still produces these cards, although their acceptability is limited and their purpose has been mostly supplanted by other forms of ID, such as provincial photo cards for non-drivers.

== Ontario ==
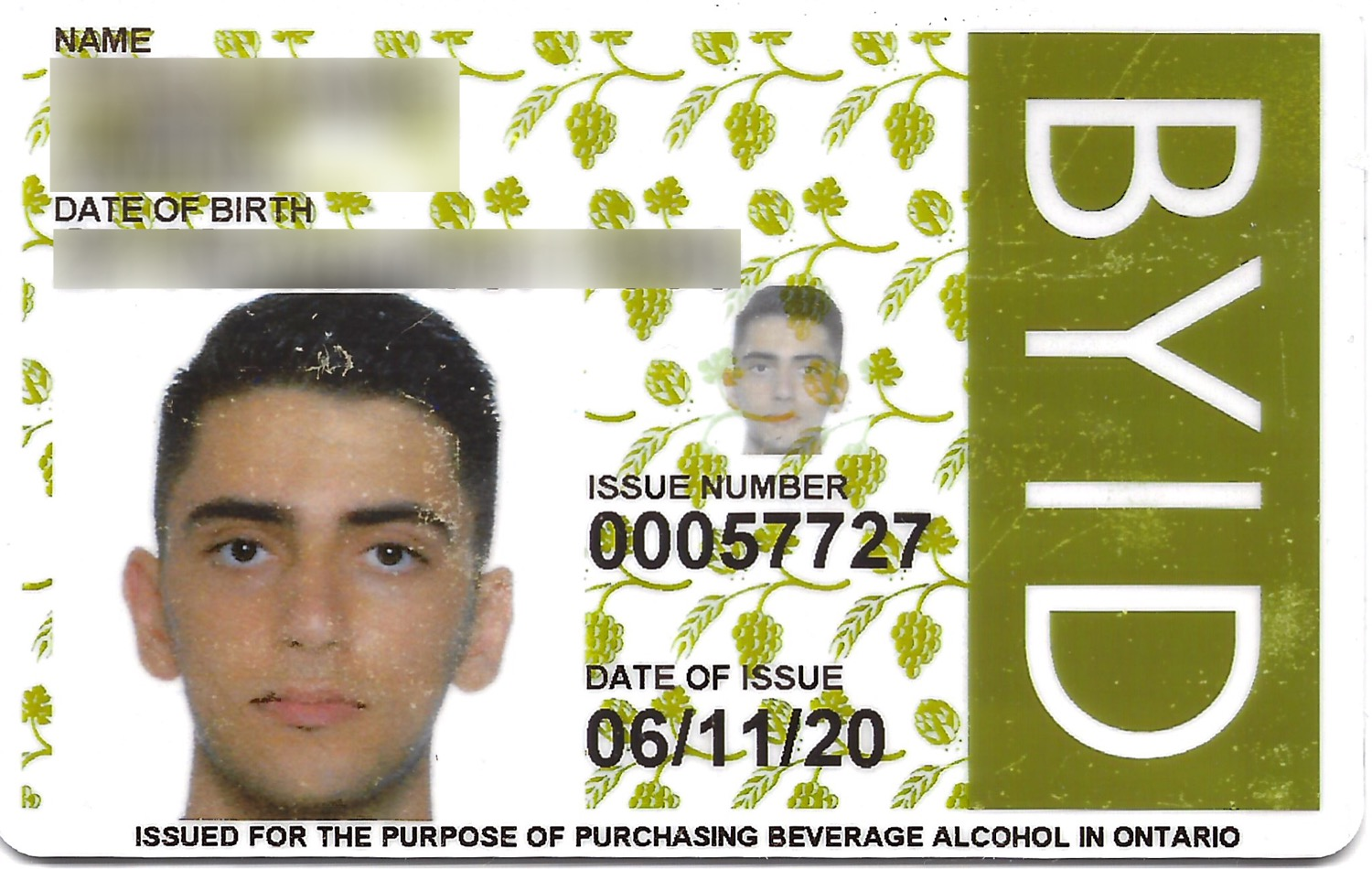
Example of a valid Ontario BYID card issued in 2020. It includes the applicant's photo, name, date of birth, issue number, and date of issue. Security features include a hologram overlay on the front and magnetic strip on the back.

For many years Ontario provided an age-of-majority card which provided proof that the Ontarian had reached the legal age to purchase alcohol. In the 1990s this card was replaced by the BYID Card (short for bring your ID) issued by the Liquor Control Board of Ontario (LCBO). As of early 2022 this card is no longer being issued, but the previously issued cards remain valid until expiry. Its widespread use is limited so that many holders report difficulty using it as an identification document. The card is issued only to Ontario residents between the ages of 19 and 35.

== New Brunswick ==
New Brunswick is known to have issued an age-of-majority card to individuals over the age of 19.

== Nova Scotia ==
The Nova Scotia Liquor Commission previously issued photo ID cards to persons over the age of 19. These cards were issued between 1974 and 1994 when they were replaced by the Nova Scotia photo identification card. Interestingly for much of the 1980s these cards misspelled the name of the province as "Nova Soctia". This was due to a printing error, and the necessity to use up the misspelled stock card before new ones were ordered, in order to save money

== Manitoba ==
Manitoba previously issued liquor control photo-identification cards.

== Yukon ==
Yukon produced Yukon Liquor ID cards. These cards have been discontinued, and existing cards became invalid in November 2011.
