= ODRP =

ODRP is a four-letter acronym that can refer to:

- Office of the Defense Representative, Pakistan (United States Department of Defense)
- Ontario Deposit Return Program
