= Liquor Control Board of Ontario =

Alcoholic beverage retailer and wholesaler in Ontario, Canada

Liquor Control Board of Ontario Régie des alcools de l’Ontario

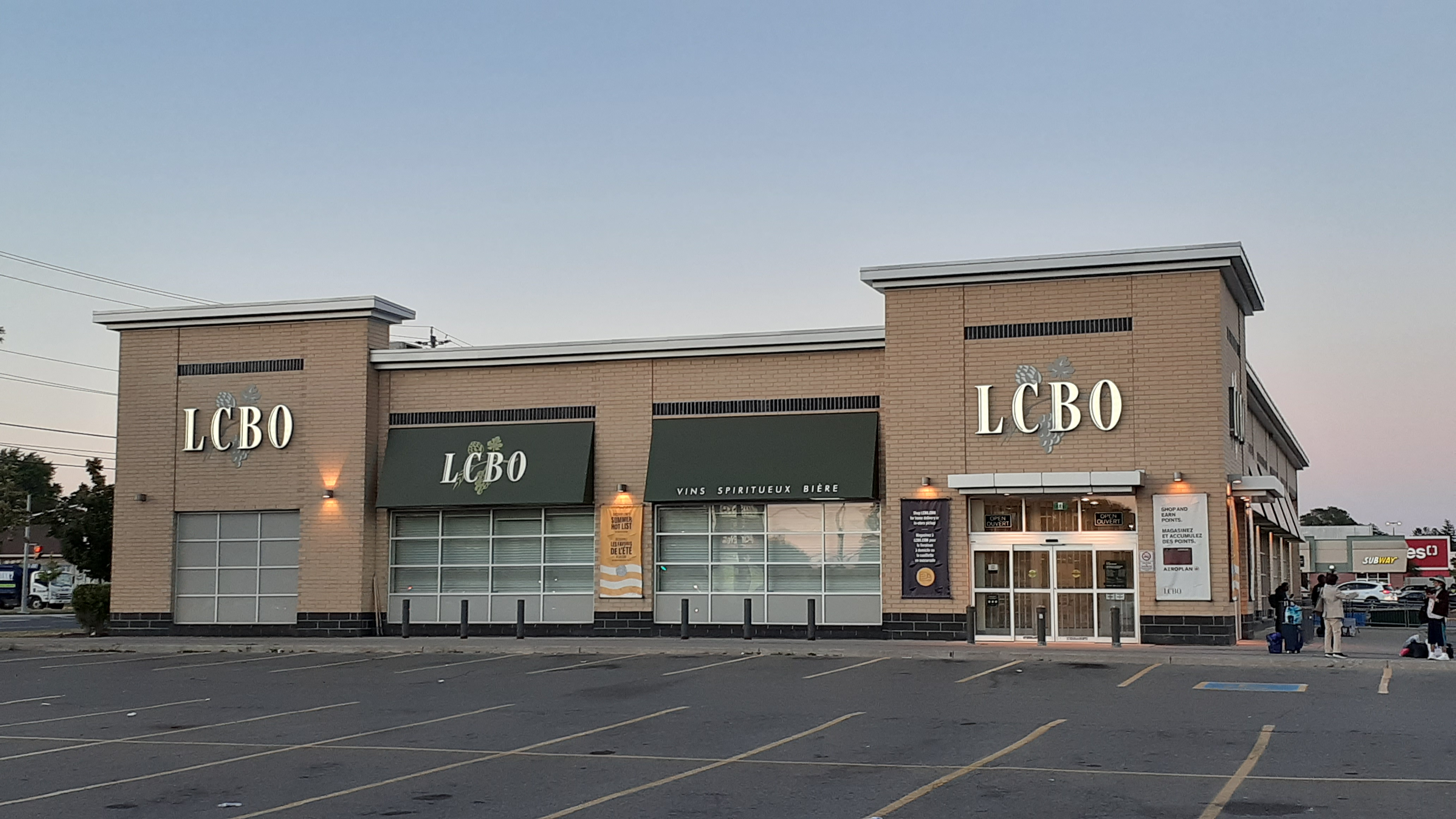
- LCBO store at Parkway Mall
- Type: Crown agency
- Industry: Retail
- Founded: 1927; 99 years ago
- Headquarters: Toronto, Ontario, Canada
- Number of locations: 677 stores (2020–21)
- Area served: Ontario
- Key people: Carmine Nigro (Chair); Aaron Campbell (President and CEO)
- Products: Liquor sales and distribution to both consumers and businesses
- Revenue: CA$7.21 billion (2020-21)
- Net income: CA$2.54 billion (2020-21)
- Number of employees: 8000+
- Website: lcbo.com

The Liquor Control Board of Ontario (LCBO, French: Régie des alcools de l'Ontario, RAO) is a Crown agency that retails and distributes alcoholic beverages throughout the Canadian province of Ontario. It is accountable to the Legislative Assembly through the minister of finance. It was established in 1927 by the government of Premier Howard Ferguson to sell liquor, wine, and beer. Such sales were banned outright in 1916 as part of prohibition in Canada. The creation of the LCBO marked an easing of the province's temperance regime. By September 2017, the LCBO was operating 651 liquor stores.

The LCBO maintained a quasi-monopoly on the trade in alcoholic beverage sales in Ontario for nearly a century after its creation: for most of this time, LCBO stores were the only retail outlets licensed to sell alcohol in Ontario, with the notable exceptions of beer (The Beer Store had a quasi-monopoly on retailing beer during most of this period) and a number of wine shops, which had once been relatively diverse but had largely consolidated into two major chains by the 2010s: the Wine Shop and Wine Rack. A number of these independent outlets were located on-site at wineries, breweries or distilleries themselves, with Wine Shop and Wine Rack locations often located within grocery stores. Because Ontario is Canada's most populous province, with over 15 million people, or almost 40% of the nation's population, LCBO's quasi-monopoly status made it one of the world's largest purchasers of alcoholic beverages.

In December 2015, the LCBO authorized some supermarkets to sell cider, wine, and beer within their grocery aisles, substantially weakening their and The Beer Store's long near-monopoly statuses. As of December 9, 2016, nearly 130 grocery stores had been licensed to do so; 450 were expected to be licensed by 2020.

The LCBO remains the chief supplier of alcoholic beverages to bars and restaurants in Ontario, which are generally required by law to purchase their alcoholic products through the LCBO, The Beer Store, or directly from Ontario wineries and breweries. The LCBO was the parent company of the Ontario Cannabis Retail Corporation, the only entity licensed to sell cannabis for recreational use in Ontario. This is no longer true following the passage of the Cannabis Statute Law Amendment Act, 2018.

== History ==
The LCBO was created in 1927 with the end of prohibition, which had been introduced in the province in 1916. The Liquor Control Act, 1927 authorized the LCBO to "control the sale, transportation and delivery" of alcoholic beverages in Ontario. Brewers Retail was created to sell beer in a controlled manner while wines and spirits (as well as beer) were sold in LCBO outlets. Wineries and breweries were also allowed to sell from their own stores, which were limited in number.

In the 1924 Ontario prohibition plebiscite, voters chose, narrowly, by a margin of 51.5% to 48.5%, to retain the Ontario Temperance Act as opposed to the government-controlled sales of beverage alcohol. The Conservative government of George Howard Ferguson contested the 1926 provincial election on a platform of easing the temperance law. Upon reelection, it introduced the Liquor Control Act as a compromise between the complete prohibition demanded by the temperance movement and the unregulated sale of alcohol. Premier Ferguson stated that the Liquor Control Act was "... to allow people to exercise a God-given freedom under reasonable restrictions". Ferguson was further quoted as saying the purpose of the LCBO was to "promote temperance sobriety, personal liberty and, above all, to restore respect for the law". To achieve these goals LCBO was mandated by Ferguson's government to employ an oversight mechanism in order to know "exactly who is buying and how much, and what disposition is being made of it".

The first chief commissioner of the LCBO was David Blyth Hanna and the first 18 stores were opened on 1 June 1927, all designed with a clear glass store front to "make the process appear apparent and with a complete absence of mystery", according to an LCBO document. Previously, only wine sales were legal but bootlegged liquor and beer were illegally sold. The business model was a process of "disinterested management"; the product was available but purchases were discouraged and moderation remained key. By the end of 1927, the province had 86 stores and three mail-order facilities.

From 1927–1962 the LCBO required people who wanted to purchase liquor to first obtain a permit (Individual Liquor Permit). The permit was valid for a year. They had to present these permits at the point of purchase, and the clerk at the liquor store would enter information about what, precisely, the individual had purchased.

Residents applied for and received individually-numbered (5 digits) liquor permits. A temporary (or duplicate) permit was a single sheet form with 6 digit number with effective and expiry dates. This was issued until the yearly permit form was received. It was also provided to non-resident visitors.

Between 1927 and 1957, these permits came in the form of passport sized books that consisted of two separate sections, the first which included the permit holder's personal information (place of residence, marital status, occupation/employer, notes change of address) and a second section which kept a record of the individual's purchase history (date, quantity, value, store number and initials). In 1957, Permit books were replaced with permit cards. These cards held the permit holder's name and their permit number and also were needed in order to purchase liquor at the LCBO. Individuals wanting to make a purchase at an LCBO store needed to fill in a purchase order form that included their name, address and permit number as well as the kind and volume of liquor that they wished to purchase. The purchase order form would be handed to an LCBO employee along with the individual's liquor permit and the employee would "examine [the] permit and see to what extent the purchaser has been buying liquor. If a purchaser had exceeded a reasonable quantity per week, the permit number and address would be noted and referred to vendor." Under the Liquor Control Act, the LCBO was to promote temperance through facilitating education and moderation. This meant a store employee could deny a sale to a customer if his intended purchases may be considered too large for one person to reasonably consume.

Purchase order forms were also used by the LCBO as a means of tracking irregularities in liquor purchases and sales and had to be stamped by the employee who had approved the sale and had filled the order. After the liquor permits books were phased out in 1957, purchase order forms were used as a means of establishing individuals' purchase histories in cases of legal investigations and the LCBO's own control processes. Purchase order forms remained in use into the 1970s when the LCBO changed to a self-serve format.

To control what it considered to be excessive purchases or other abuses of the permit privilege, the LCBO employed a list called the interdiction list. Although interdiction was initially a formalized legal process imposed by a judge upon those found in open court to be "drunkards", the board was charged with maintaining the list between 1927 and 1975 and employed its own standards in adding individuals to this list without any involvement of the justice system. The list was circulated to all liquor stores and drinking establishments, and was sent to local and provincial police forces to whom it was explained that it was a crime for listed individuals to possess or be sold any liquor. Between 1927 and 1975, the LCBO conducted its own investigations into over consumption, employing a staff of investigators that visited individuals' homes, work, banks, neighbours and even churches to determine if an individual should be restricted from purchasing liquor. From 1927–1935, the LCBO's investigations resulted in the cancellation of over 33,138 liquor permits and the names of these individuals were added to the circulated interdiction list. In 1929, the LCBO's use of the interdiction list was expanded to include those on social assistance as well as others who the board felt should be prohibited from purchasing liquor permits entirely. Between 1929 and 1951, when the LCBO ceased publishing interdiction data in its annual reports, 125,218 individuals had been added to the interdiction list in this way.

In 1934, the mandate of the LCBO was expanded to include the oversight of by-the-glass sale of alcohol in standard hotels and other drinking establishments. As part of the LCBO's regulations, licensed establishments were required to adhere to a wide variety of regulations including a limitation on singing, the number of patrons allowed to sit together and most importantly the segregation of female from unmarried male drinkers (women were only allowed to drink in the presence of a "bona fide escort" in a segregated "Ladies and Escorts" room). The task of overseeing the sale of alcohol in drinking establishments was later passed in 1944 to a short-lived government licensing agency and later to the Liquor Licensing Board of Ontario (LLBO) in 1947.

The first self-service store was introduced in 1969. In the 1970s, the stores became more inviting with decorative displays of alcohol, and in the 2000s, were renovated and enlarged to hold more product. Most current stores have vintages sections with rotating selections of wines and spirits having low production volumes.

In the 1990s, the LCBO rebranded stores by removing the Ontario coat of arms and wording "Liquor Store" with the more stylized LCBO logo.

George Soleas was appointed president and CEO on June 9, 2016.

As of July 11, 2016, LCBO accepts tap-to-pay technology in each of their 654 stores in the province, allowing contactless payment for all purchases of liquor.

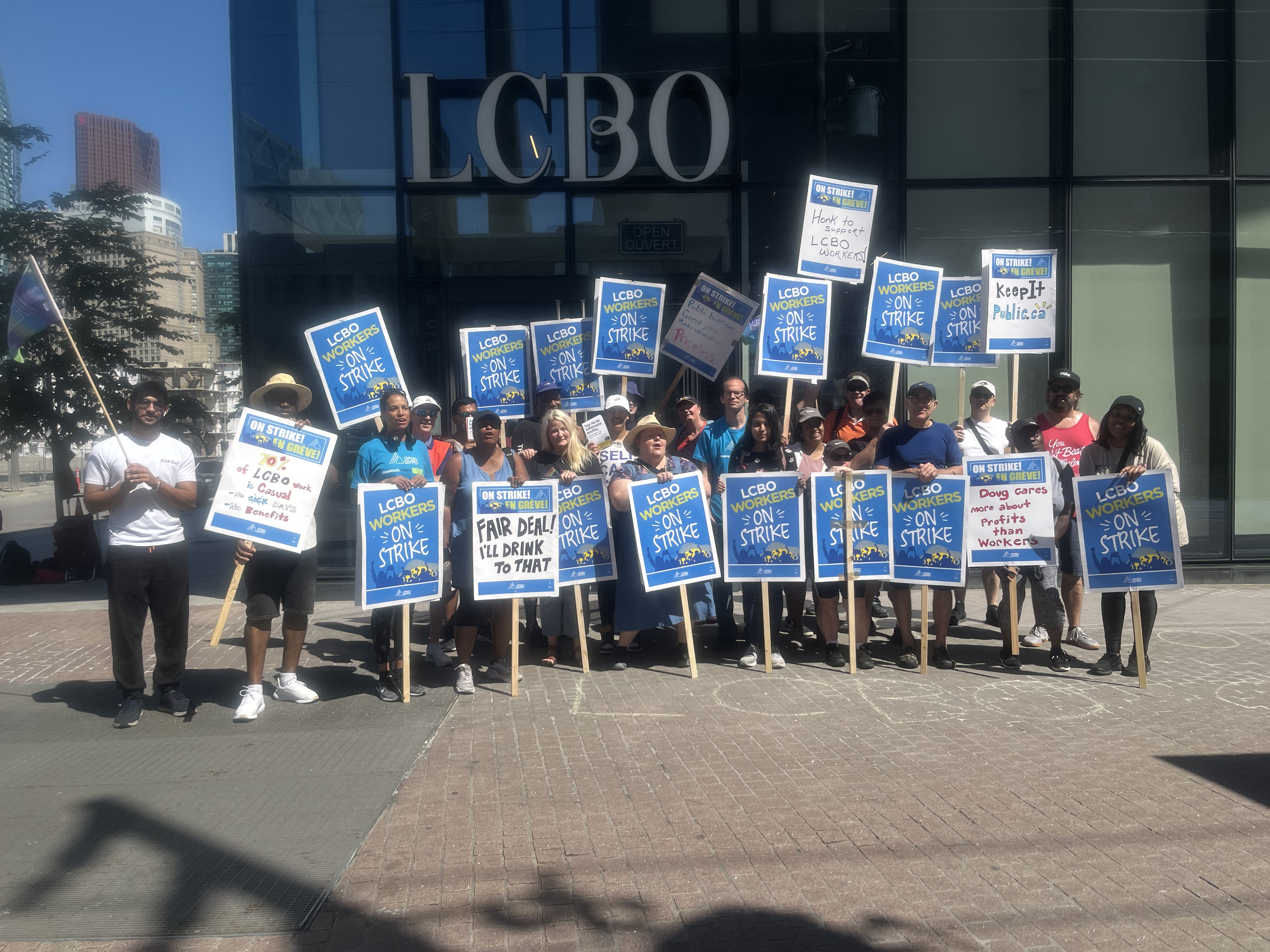
Strikers at the LCBO HQ in downtown Toronto in July 2024.

On July 5, 2024, employees went on strike for the first time in the LCBO's history. The strike ended on July 22, 2024.

In February 2025, the LCBO was ordered by Ontario premier Doug Ford to remove all sales of American alcohol in response to the Second Trump tariffs.

=== Sale of cannabis ===
After the federal government announced that recreational use of cannabis would be legalized in 2017 or early 2018, then Premier Kathleen Wynne commented that the LCBO stores might be the ideal distribution network for stocking, controlling and selling such products. The Ontario Public Service Employees Union, which represents LCBO staff, also lobbied for the LCBO to have a monopoly on cannabis sales.

In response, the federal Task Force on Marijuana Legalization and Regulation recommended against selling cannabis in conjunction with alcohol. In September 2017, the Government of Ontario announced that the LCBO alone would sell recreational marijuana to the public in the province, except in the 651 stores that sell alcoholic beverages. A new Crown corporation, the Ontario Cannabis Retail Corporation (OCRC), was established as a subsidiary of the LCBO with a mandate to initially open 40 stores before legalization took effect in October 2018. OCRC also entered a partnership with Shopify to use the company's platform for operating the province's online cannabis sales. In March 2018, OCRC adopted the trading name Ontario Cannabis Store for its retail services. The OCS logo, designed by a Canadian subsidiary of Leo Burnett Worldwide as part of a $650,000 marketing and branding contract, was derided as "boring" and "underwhelming."

Following the 2018 provincial election, the new provincial government led by Premier Doug Ford announced that OCRC would not open physical stores and that private stores would instead sell cannabis in Ontario. Under this new model OCRC will continue to operate the provincial online cannabis sales service and will serve as the wholesale supplier for private stores in Ontario. The Alcohol and Gaming Commission of Ontario's mandate will be widened to include regulation and licensing of private cannabis stores in Ontario. The OCRC would also be moved under the jurisdiction of the Ministry of Finance, would no longer be a subsidiary of the LCBO, and would no longer use the Ontario Cannabis Store branding.

== Mandate and accountability ==
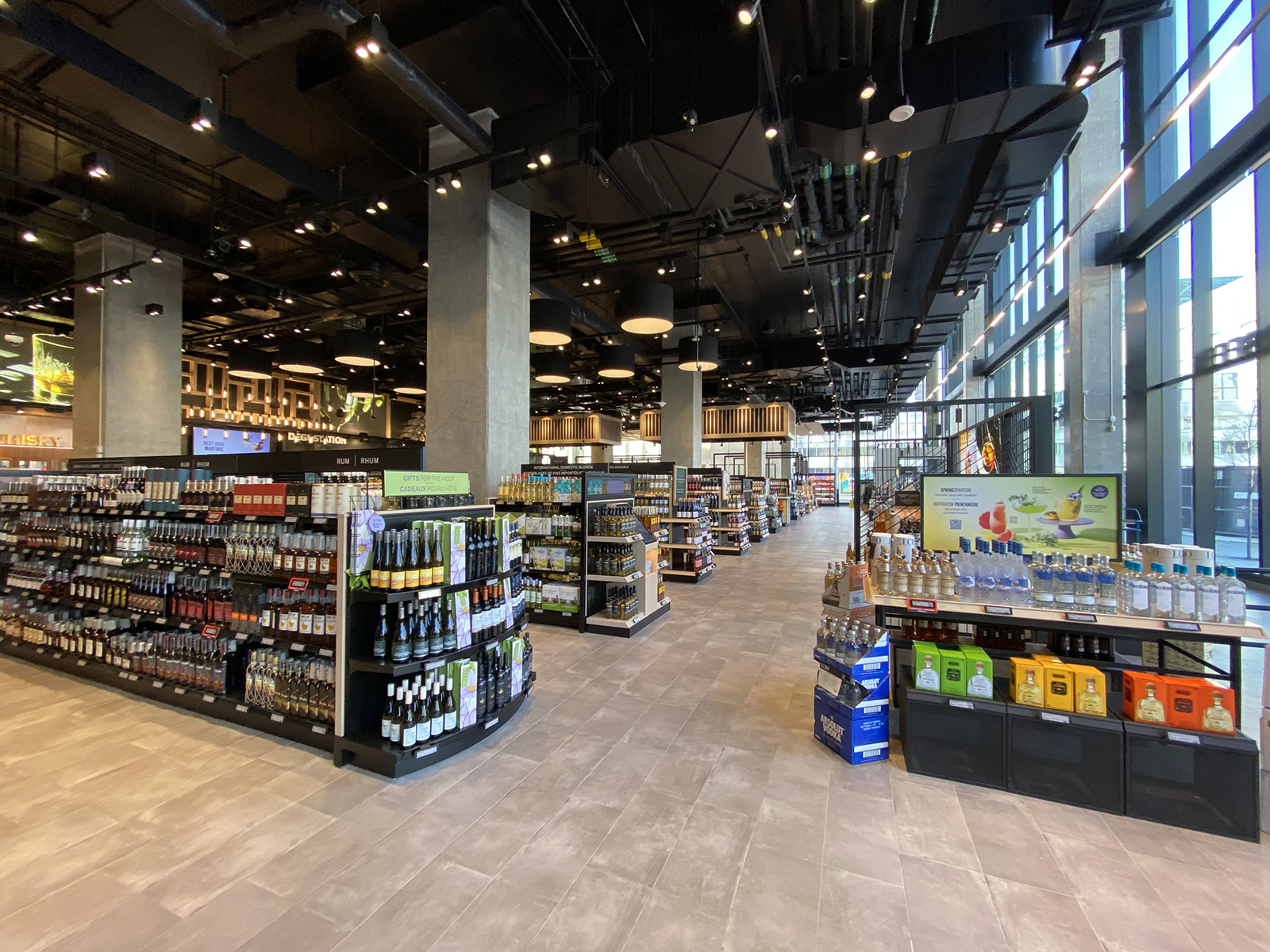
LCBO in 100 Queens Quay East, Toronto

The mandate of the board is to supervise the business affairs of the LCBO. Among its responsibilities are:

- ensuring that the LCBO provides high-quality service to the public
- developing and approving the strategic plan and monitoring management's success in meeting its business plans
- approving annual financial plans
- ensuring that the organization remains financially sound
- assessing the management of business risks
- submitting an annual financial plan to the minister of finance
- ensuring the organization has communications programs to inform stakeholders of significant business developments
- ensuring that the LCBO performs its regulatory role in a fair and impartial manner

The LCBO is accountable to its stakeholders in a number of ways, including:

- its annual report, required to be tabled in the Legislative Assembly and available for review, either in print or online
- annual audits of LCBO financial statements by the Office of the Provincial Auditor, as well as internal value-for-money audits of specific LCBO programs, including store planning
- public access to records under the Freedom of Information and Protection of Privacy Act
- board members appointed by the lieutenant governor, through Orders in Council, on the recommendation of the premier and the minister of finance.
- various statutory reporting requirements under the Liquor Control Act to the minister of finance.
- compliance with Management Board's Agency Accountability Directives.

== Signage ==
The board's policy states that "In Ontario's 25 designated areas, the operational signage in every LCBO store must be bilingual" ... "This type of signage includes stores' permanent signs and general notices, such as those in the aisles and for customer service."

== Pricing ==
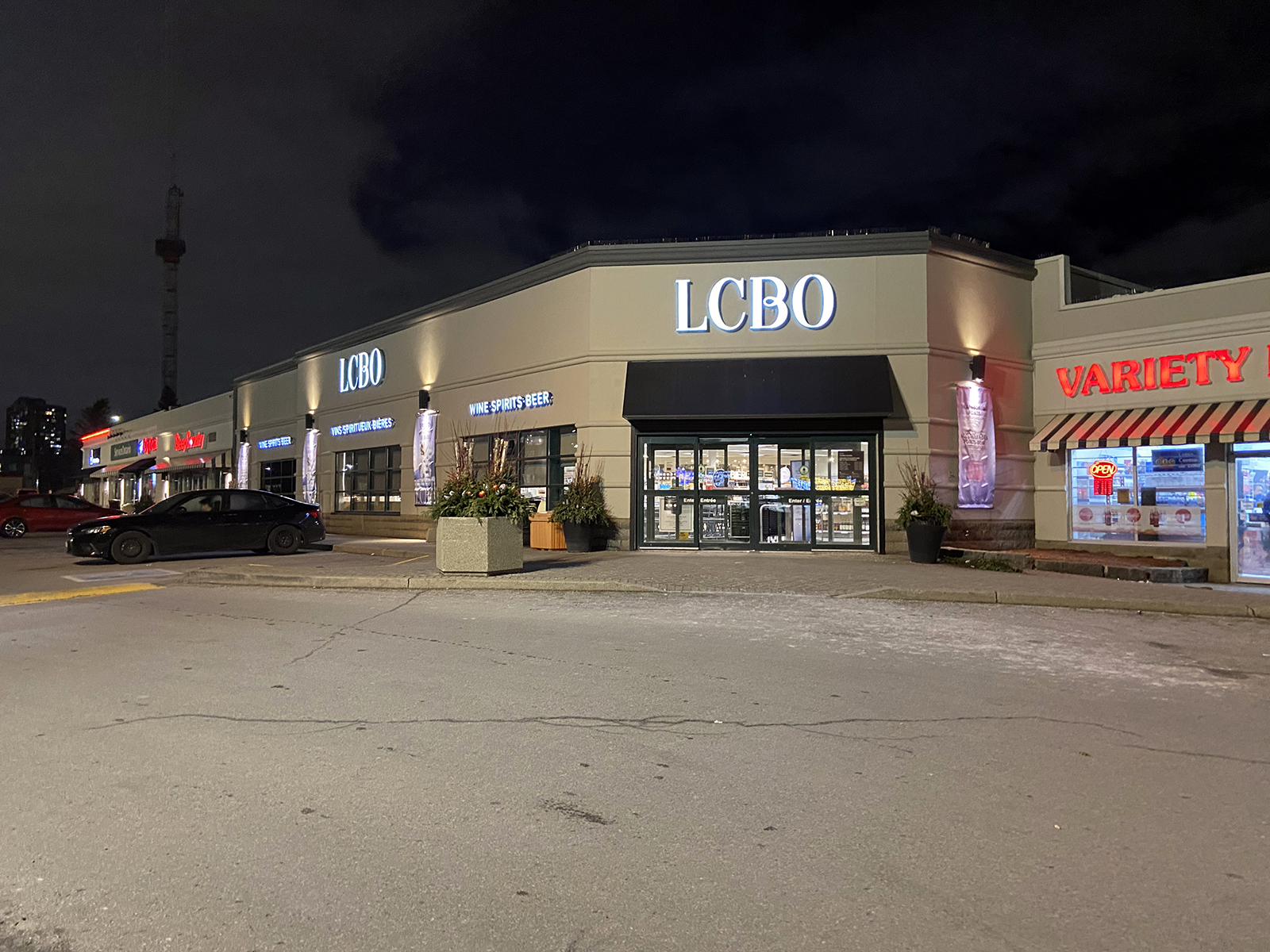
An LCBO outlet in Mississauga, Ontario in 2023

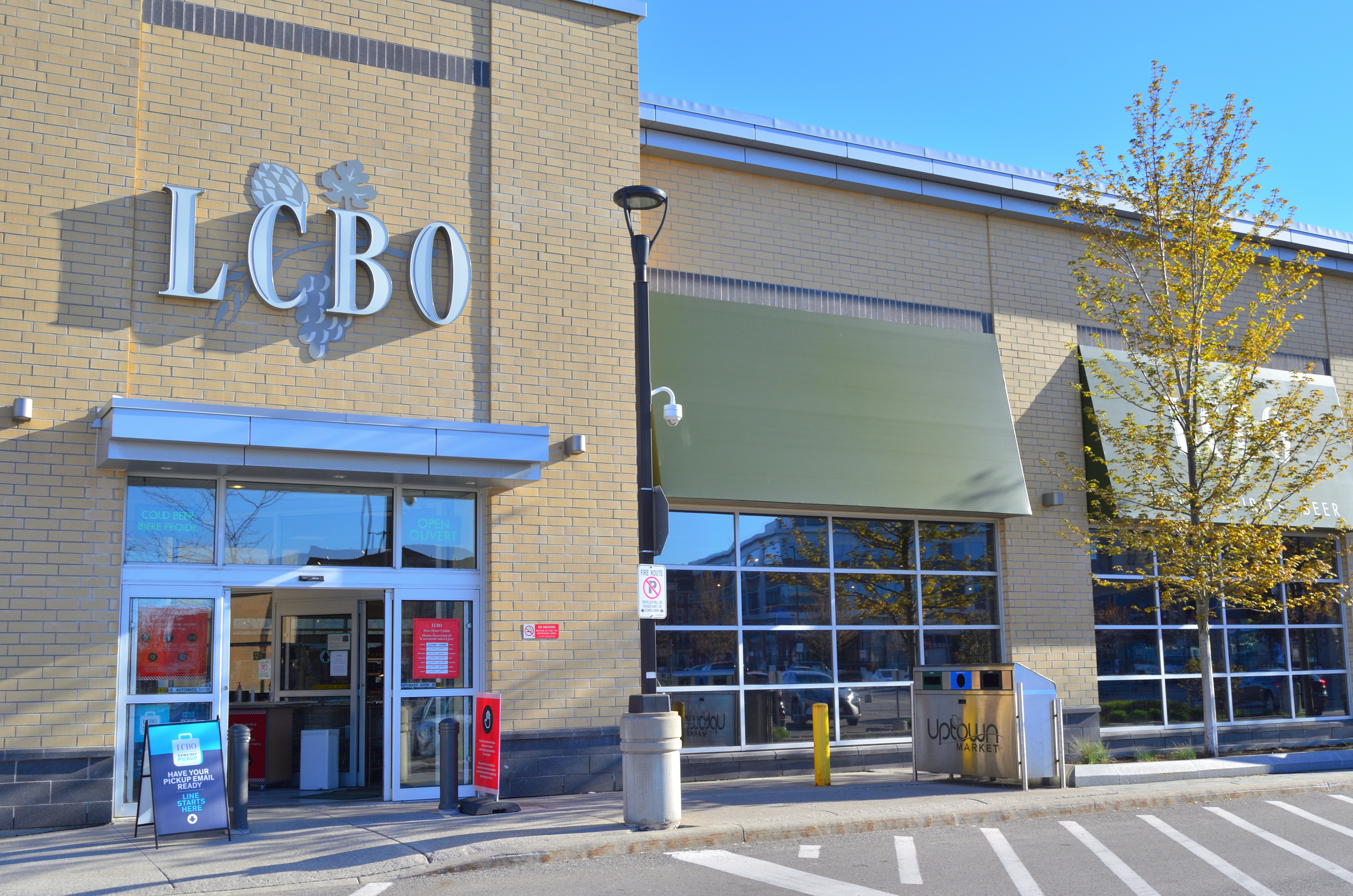
An LCBO outlet in Markham, Ontario in 2020

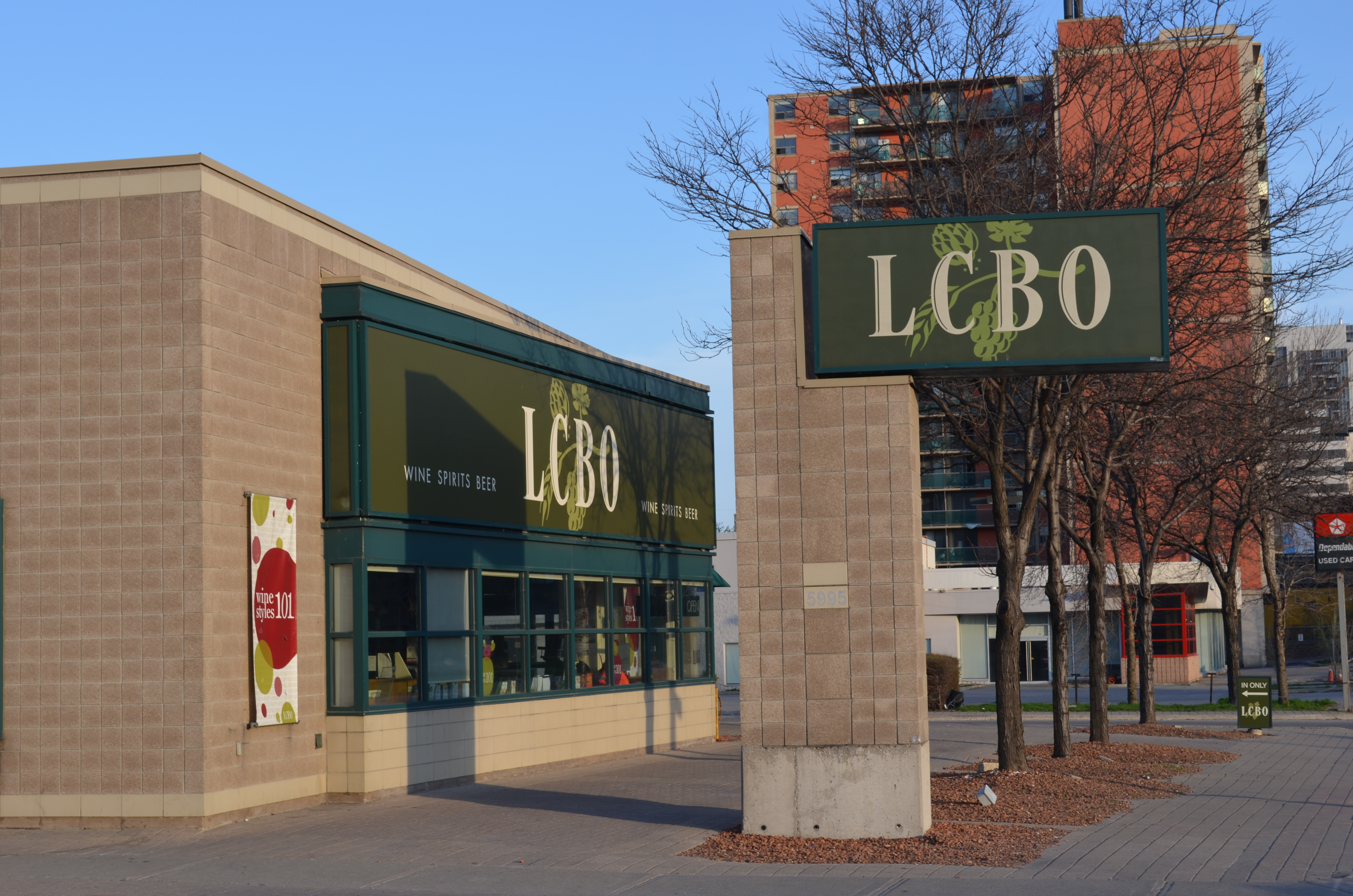
An LCBO outlet in Toronto, Ontario in 2014

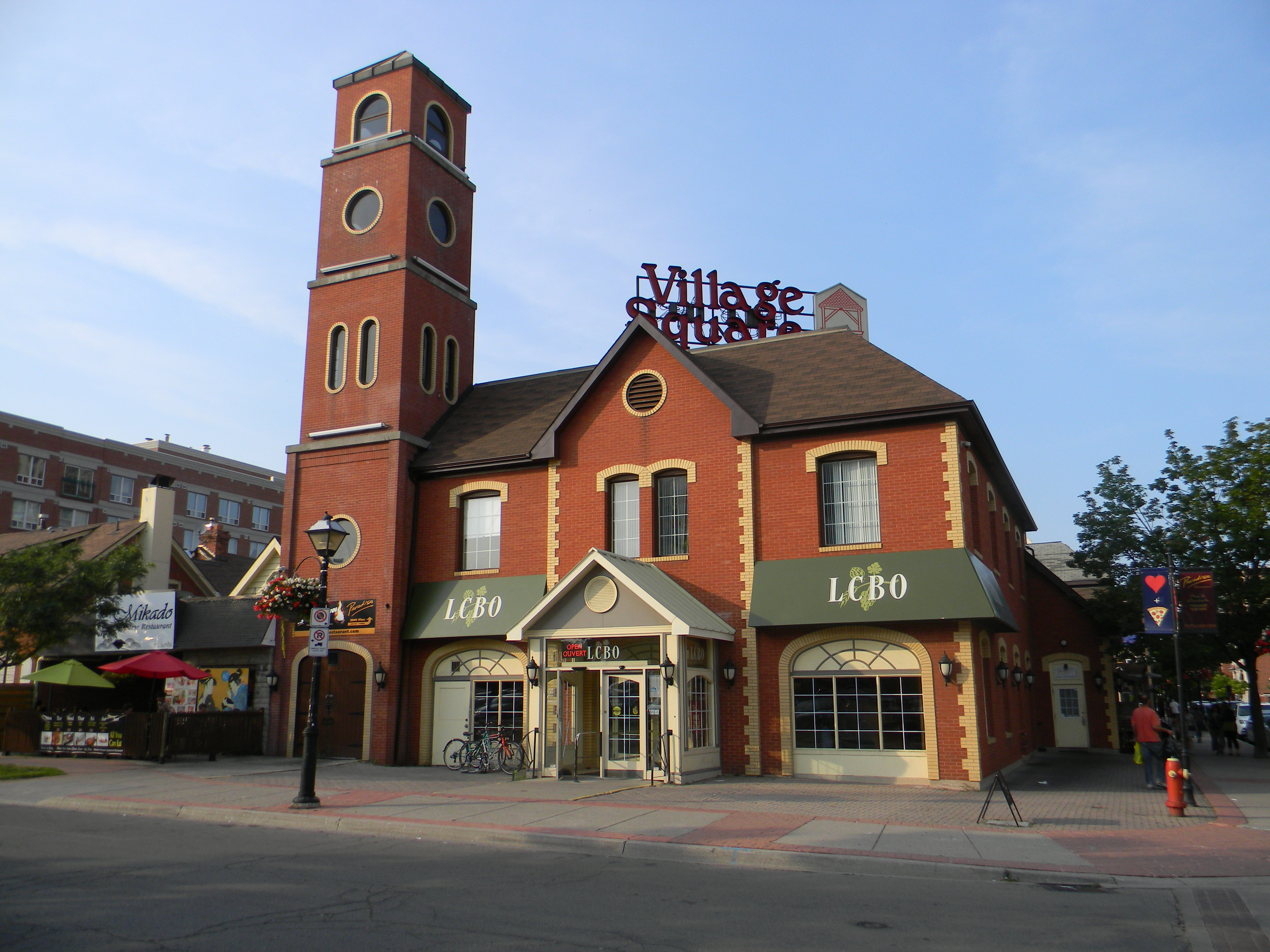
An LCBO outlet in Burlington, Ontario in 2014

While it is impossible to generalize comparative pricing for the thousands of different alcoholic beverages available through LCBO, the stores have acquired a reputation for high prices. Online price comparisons with independent wine retailers such as Sherry-Lehman in neighbouring New York can indicate price differences ranging from 10% (in LCBO's favour) to 30% (in the independent retailers' favour). Wines and spirits sold in Canada are subject to the Excise Act, 2001, which contributes greatly to the cost of beverage alcohol, although most liquor tax is provincial & federal. Wine Access, a Canadian food and wine magazine, has claimed that high-end luxury brands sell in Ontario for up to 60% more than in New York. Excise duties on beer and malt liquor are taxed under the Excise Act.

The LCBO pricing policies are designed to control alcohol consumption, generate revenue for the provincial and federal governments, and to support the domestic alcohol beverage industry, especially by providing incentive to purchase Ontario wine. Within this framework, the prices of LCBO products are subject to three policy constraints:

- All prices are uniform throughout the province, despite inevitable differential costs incurred by transportation and distribution. This policy effectively subsidizes the transportation of goods into the rural parts of the province. Store managers have the right to reduce prices of 'bin-end' items at their discretion.
- Less-intoxicating beverages such as light wines and beer are in effect sold by the LCBO at reduced prices (lower tax rate based on ABV), again with the stated object of influencing consumption patterns as part of the board's social responsibility mandate.

== Profits ==
The LCBO transferred a dividend of $2.58 billion to the provincial government in 2019.

Fiscal Year	Dividend to Provincial Government (in billions of Canadian Dollars($))
2008	1.40
2009	1.41
2010	1.55
2011	1.63
2012	1.70
2013	1.74
2014	1.805
2015	1.935
2016	2.06

== Debate over privatization ==
There have been a number of discussions about whether the province should sell, or privatize, the LCBO. It has been argued that the main benefit would be the billions of dollars that would be the immediate windfall from any sale. This sale would only deliver a one-time profit, and the province would lose out on a source of steady yearly income. It has also been argued by the C. D. Howe Institute that the government could actually earn more money by dismantling the high-margin retail stores while keeping the lucrative wholesale business as Alberta's (AGLC: Alberta Gaming, Liquor & Cannabis) privatization of the liquor business retail stores suggests. The LCBO's 2006-07 net income was $1.3 billion Canadian dollars (excluding tax revenues generated by Brewers Retail and the independent wine stores), and a sale has been estimated to reap about six billion dollars. Former Premier Ernie Eves stated that when he investigated this possibility, he found that a 100 per cent sale through an income trust would generate 16 billion dollars.

In an attempt to find more revenue for the government within the current system, former Ontario Finance Minister Greg Sorbara ordered a review of the province's liquor distribution methods, under the supervision of John Lacey, a former LCBO board member and grocery executive. Sorbara had stated that any option, other than the complete privatization of the LCBO, would be open for discussion. Subsequent to the release of the report, known as the Beverage Alcohol System Review (BASR), Sorbara rejected the report's recommendations and argued for the continued public ownership of the LCBO. Rejection of the findings notwithstanding, the 2005 report defined the potential benefits of privatization alternatives as greater consumer convenience and choice via a competitive retail environment, a reduction in government-held investment risk while simultaneously increasing its annual revenues.

An earlier 1994 report from York University, created on behalf of the Ontario Liquor Boards Employees' Union, concluded there to be little governmental or public support for privatization. There may be political motivations to keep alcohol sales public as well, as the LCBO is an excellent source of sinecures for the sitting government. The current LCBO board chair is Carmine Nigro. Philip J. Olsson, a long-time Liberal supporter, was the former chair appointed by the Liberal government shortly after they took power. Prior to Olsson was Andy Brandt, who was appointed by New Democratic Premier Bob Rae in 1991, even though Brandt had been a Progressive Conservative member of Provincial Parliament for a number of years. In 2007, LCBO separated the board chair and president/CEO functions, making the board chair position part-time. Olsson receives a per-diem for his work as board chair, which he donates to the United Way.

== Recycling program ==
The LCBO has phased out its plastic shopping bags, as part of its efforts to become a greener organization. LCBO customers are encouraged to bring their own reusable bags, but can also request handle-less LCBO paper bags or buy reusable bags at the store. Cardboard carrying boxes for individual cans of beer were phased out, with a limited reintroduction during the fall of 2017. As of 2020, 8 pack beer carriers are available at all LCBO locations again. The LCBO says the new limited options are expected to eliminate approximately 80 million plastic bags a year from landfill.

In September 2006, the Government of Ontario announced the Ontario Deposit Return Program, a recycling program for LCBO and winery store beverage alcohol containers. The program, which commenced operations on 5 February 2007, is administered and operated by Brewers Retail Inc. Under the program, consumers may return empty bottles, tetra paks, PET plastic and bag-in-box containers, to The Beer Store outlets. This program has been highly criticized by members of the public and employees of The Beer Store. Beer Stores were seeing upward of 50,000 LCBO containers per week while the unprofitable nature of the program forced wage cuts and staff reductions across Ontario's primary beer distributor.

The deposit rates for the bottles are as follows:

- Large bottles (greater than 630 ml) – $0.20 each
- Small containers (equal to or less than 630 ml) – $0.10 each

Through its Natural Heritage Fund, LCBO and its suppliers have raised almost $2 million for projects to restore and rehabilitate Ontario wildlife habitat. This includes Bring Back the Salmon, which helps the return of Atlantic salmon to Lake Ontario after its local extinction over 100 years ago.

== Agencies ==
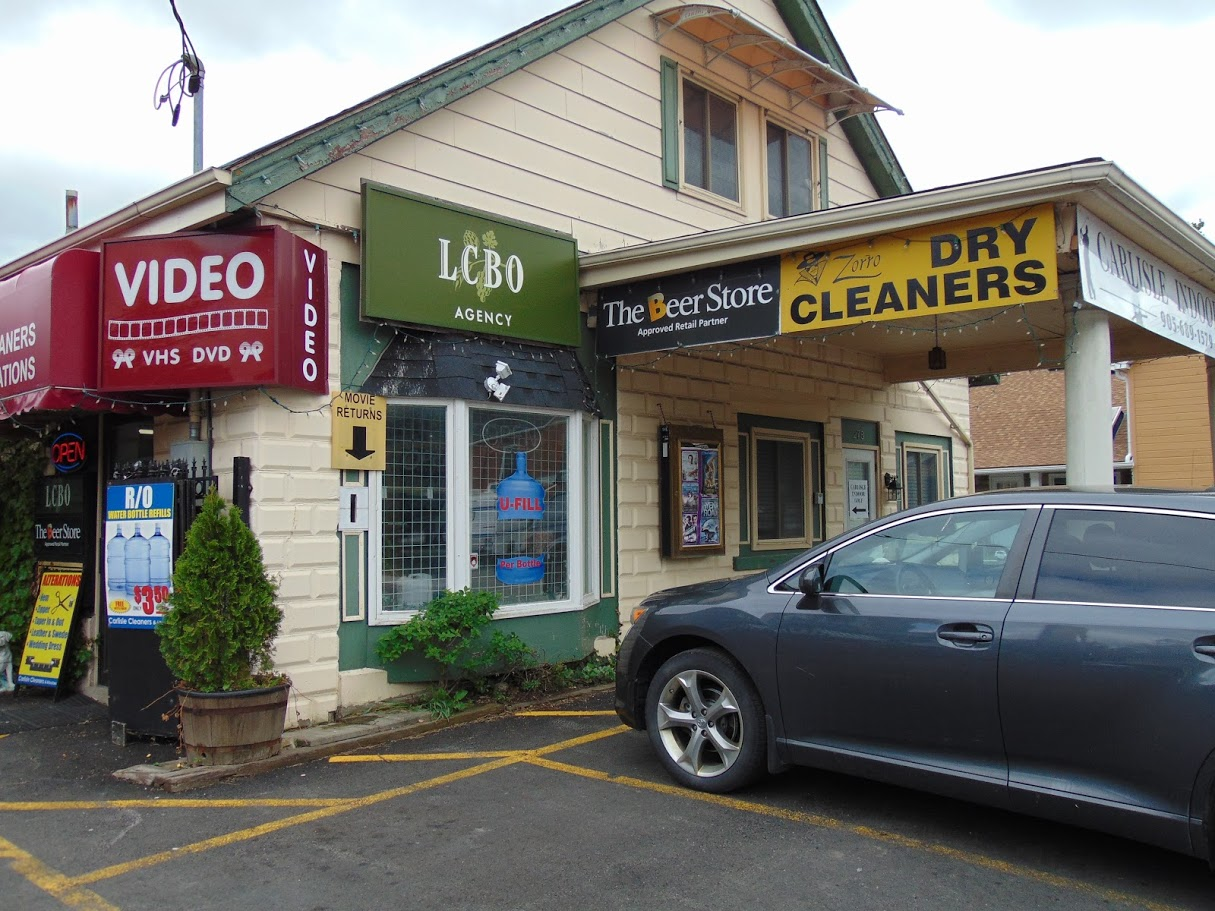
A LCBO Agency store in Carlisle in 2016

An LCBO Agency is a legally licensed outlet of the Liquor Control Board of Ontario. Such agencies are placed in small towns and areas far from a full-service LCBO location. Agency locations are operated by private businesses and allocated through a competitive process.

== Controversies ==
=== Cellared in Canada ===
In late 2009, local and international criticism of the "Cellared in Canada" practice and the LCBO emerged. Under the "Cellared in Canada" label, which is now officially known as "International - Canadian blends", Canadian wine producers are allowed to import pre-fermented grape must from grapes grown in other countries to produce wines under their own wine label, although in practice, it is usually finished wine which is imported to be included in International - Canadian blends. In Ontario, producers are allowed to designate these wines as "cellared" in Canada if they contain a portion of local Ontario grapes. As of April 1, 2014, this percentage is 25% Ontario wine, which may be from labrusca varieties. Historically, this percentage has fluctuated wildly, due to periodic shortages and surpluses of Ontario grapes, and heavy lobbying by large producers and some grape growers.

Grape growers in Ontario have deemed this practice a threat to their livelihood, asserting that thousands of tons of Canadian grapes are left rotting on the vine, while large producers use imported grapes to make wine labelled as "Canadian". Growers and producers have criticized this practice as tarnishing the reputation of Canadian wines and misleading consumers. They have also petitioned the government for several changes in the practices, such as making the origin of grapes clearer on the wine label, and increasing the visibility of 100% Canadian Vintners Quality Alliance (VQA) wines in province-run liquor stores. As of August 2009, the stores of the LCBO featured less than 2.5% Canadian wine produced by VQA members, with the vast majority of its wines produced under the "International - Canadian blend" designation with up to 75% foreign wine. Bottles generally say "Cellared in Canada from International and Domestic Content".

=== Age verification ===
In May 2011, a study was conducted by Statopex Field Marketing on behalf of the Ontario Convenience Stores Association and found that the LCBO fared poorly when checking for age of minors. Minors between the age of 15 and 18 were used to determine how often LCBO store staff would check for ID before selling alcohol. Minors in the test were accompanied by an adult at a distance to verify any sales that occurred. The test determined that 1 in 4 minors were able to purchase beer at the LCBO without ID. This was poorer than the results shown for The Beer Store, where 1 in 5 minors could purchase beer, or chain convenience stores in Ontario where as few as 1 in 8 could purchase tobacco. The LCBO countered by stating its "retail staff challenged 3.6 million people who appeared underage or intoxicated in 2010 and refused to serve more than 190,000 customers."

=== Cannabis sale monopoly ===
Some have questioned the methodical suitability of the OCRC monopoly on cannabis sales. The Cannabis Canada Association, a lobby group representing licensed medical marijuana growers, stated that "a competitive market model would provide the Province with a predictable, low-risk revenue stream without the taxpayer burdens of upfront capital expenditure exposure and operational risk".

The debate proved to be merely of academic interest, since the newly-elected PC government decided in August 2018 that retail sales would be provided by private enterprise companies instead. Finance Minister Vic Fedeli stated: "we will work with private sector businesses to build a safe, reliable retail system that will divert sales away from the illegal market."

=== High theft incidence ===
In late 2018, two articles published by the Toronto Star indicated that theft from the LCBO retail stores was a significant problem, and effectively mishandled. There had been some 9,000 thefts at LCBO outlets in Toronto alone since early 2014, according to data provided by the Toronto Police Service. In fiscal year 2018–2019, the LCBO saw more than $5.1 million in theft of alcohol. For reasons of personal safety, LCBO staff are discouraged from confronting shoplifters. "The LCBO doesn’t want their staff getting into tussles with thieves inside the store, and I understand that. But when you couple that with a policing decision that says we just don’t have the resources to respond unless the thief is on the scene, you lose a lot of the deterrent," said Mike McCormack, president of the Toronto Police Association. As a result, thefts were likely to continue, leading to frustration by staff and the public.

== See also ==
- Alberta Gaming and Liquor Commission – successor of the Alberta Liquor Control Board (ALCB)
- Liquor Distribution Branch's BC Liquor Stores
- Manitoba Liquor Control Commission
- New Brunswick Liquor Corporation
- Newfoundland and Labrador Liquor Corporation
- Northwest Territories Liquor and Cannabis Commission
- Nova Scotia Liquor Corporation
- Nunavut Liquor and Cannabis Commission
- Prince Edward Island Liquor Control Commission
- Société des alcools du Québec (SAQ)
- Saskatchewan Liquor and Gaming Authority
- Yukon Liquor Corporation
