= The Beer Store =

Canadian beverage retailer

Brewers Retail Inc.
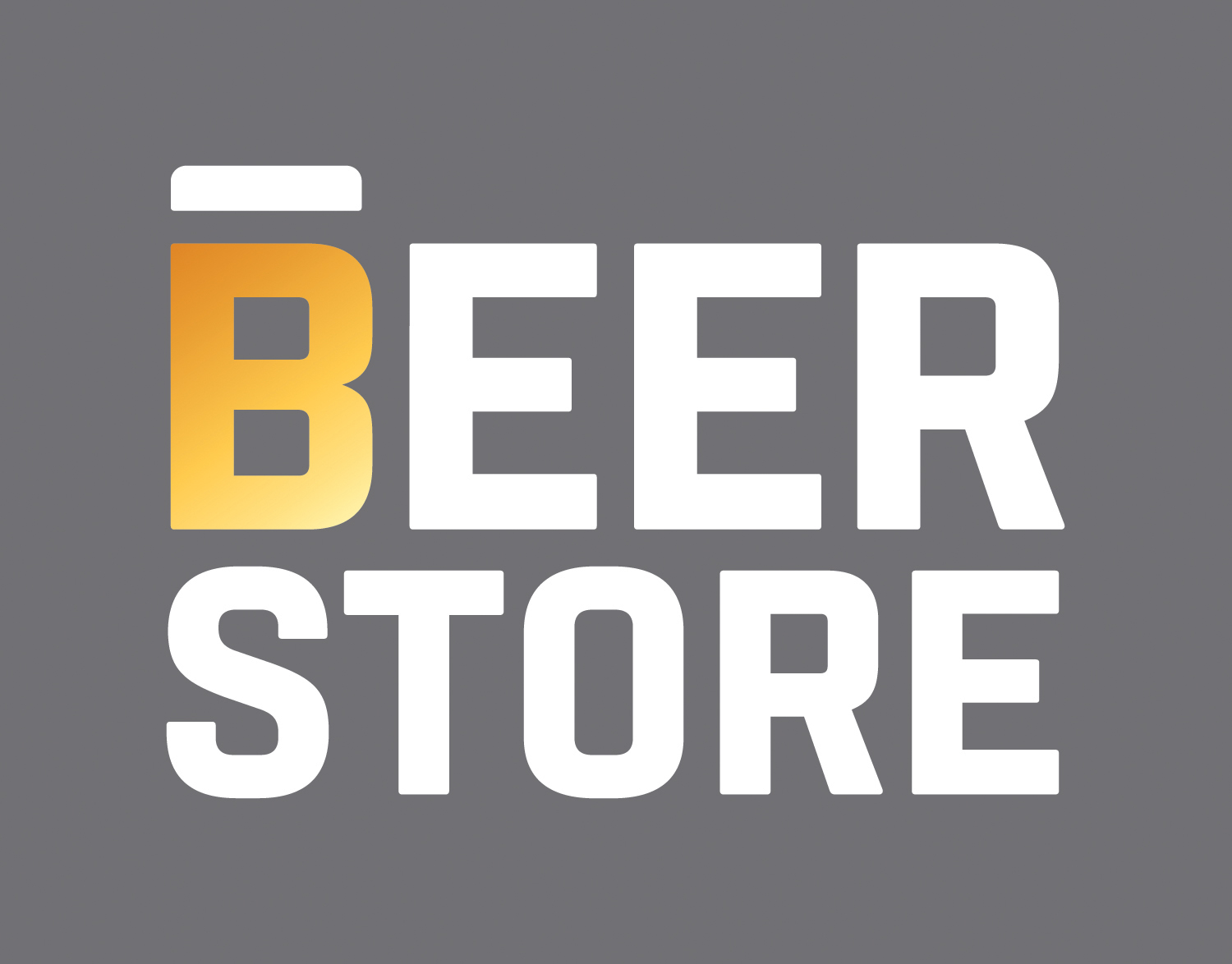
- Trade name: The Beer Store
- Formerly: Brewers Retail (1927–1985)
- Type: Joint venture
- Industry: Beer distribution Beer retail sales
- Founded: 1927; 99 years ago
- Headquarters: Bolton, Ontario, Canada
- Number of locations: 300 to 325 by end of 2025
- Area served: Ontario
- Key people: Roy Benin (president)
- Services: Distribution and sale of beer
- Revenue: Operates on a break-even cash flow basis.
- Owners: Molson Coors - 50.9%; Labatt Brewing Company (AB InBev) - 44.9%; Sleeman Breweries (Sapporo Breweries) - 4.2%
- Number of employees: 6540 (2018)
- Website: thebeerstore.ca

Brewers Retail Inc., doing business as The Beer Store, is a privately owned chain of retail outlets selling beer and other malt beverages in the province of Ontario, Canada.

Founded in 1927 as Brewers Retail, it was owned at its inception by a consortium of Ontario-based brewers. It currently operates as a unique open retail and wholesale system primarily owned by three brewing companies: Molson, Labatt, and Sleeman, which are owned by multinational corporations. It is also partially owned (under 0.02%) by 30 Ontario-based brewers. Under the ownership model, all qualified brewers are free to list their products without discrimination and to set their own selling prices, subject to Liquor Control Board of Ontario (LCBO) price approval that must comply with legislated minimum and uniform pricing requirements.

Under Ontario's Liquor Control Act, The Beer Store was formerly the only retailer permitted to sell beer for off-site consumption, other than stores on the site of a brewery, locations of the provincial government-owned LCBO, and LCBO-authorized agency stores in certain smaller communities. The act and the company's articles of incorporation further stipulate that Brewers Retail cannot sell "hard liquor" (spirits) or consumer goods (like groceries). Brewers Retail adopted the current name in 1985.

Amendments made to the Liquor Control Act have since allowed for the sale of single and 6 packs of beer at select supermarkets in Ontario. That was done to enhance customer access and convenience. The Beer Store, however, continues to maintain pricing exclusivity in providing consumers discounts on larger packs of beer, along with retail partners, agency stores, combination stores and manufacturer outlets. What distinguishes the Beer Store is its characterization as a sort of "beer commons." A 2013 Angus Reid survey commissioned by the Ontario Convenience Stores Association found that only 13% of Ontario residents were aware that "The Beer Store monopoly is not a government-owned enterprise." The Beer Store operated approximately 450 outlets in Ontario and made a gross profit of about $396-million in 2016.

In early June 2019, the provincial government passed legislation to terminate its 10-year contract with the company, six years prior to expiry; continued negotiations with TBS were underway prior to actual enactment of the legislation. This step was a prelude to making beer widely available in variety stores in Ontario.

In May 2024, the Ontario government announced an agreement with Brewers Retail allowing beer, wine, cider, and ready-to-mix alcoholic beverages to be sold, before the scheduled end of the master contract, in 8,000 corner stores, grocery stores, gas stations and eventually big box chains in exchange for $225 million in compensation being paid to The Beer Store. Sales in grocery and corner stores began in September 2024. As a result, The Beer Store' s market share is expected to fall from 41% in 2024 to 15% by 2026-27. Under the agreement, The Beer Store will continue to operate at least 300 stores until the end of 2025, after which there will be no restrictions on the number of outlets that may be shut down.

== Company ==
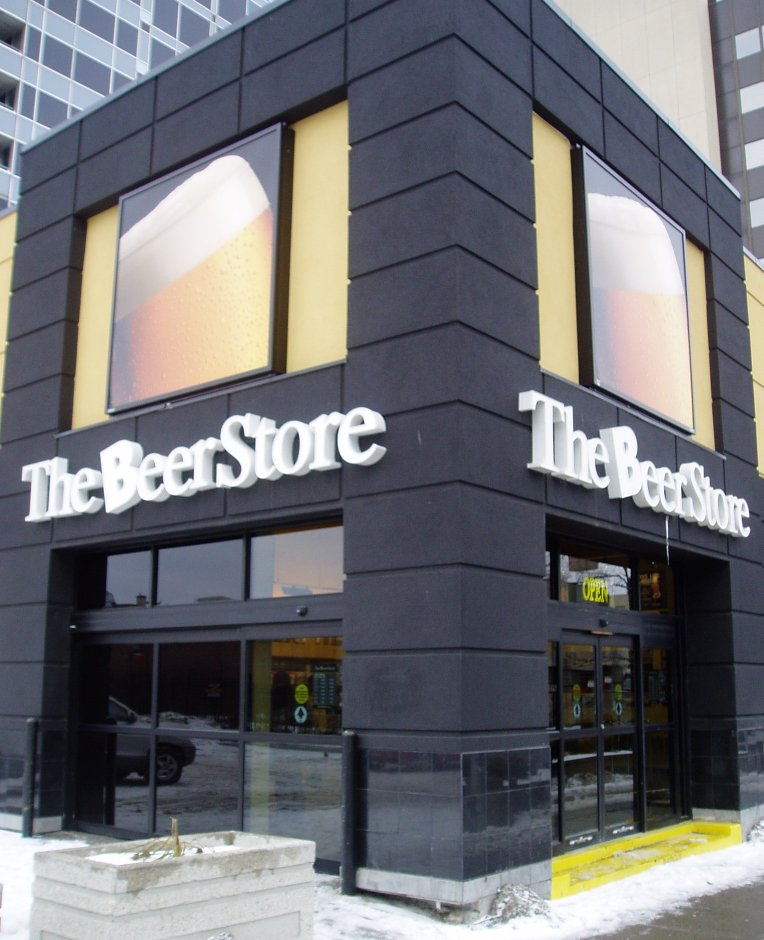
A Beer Store outlet in downtown Ottawa, NCR on Rideau Street (closed since October 2018)

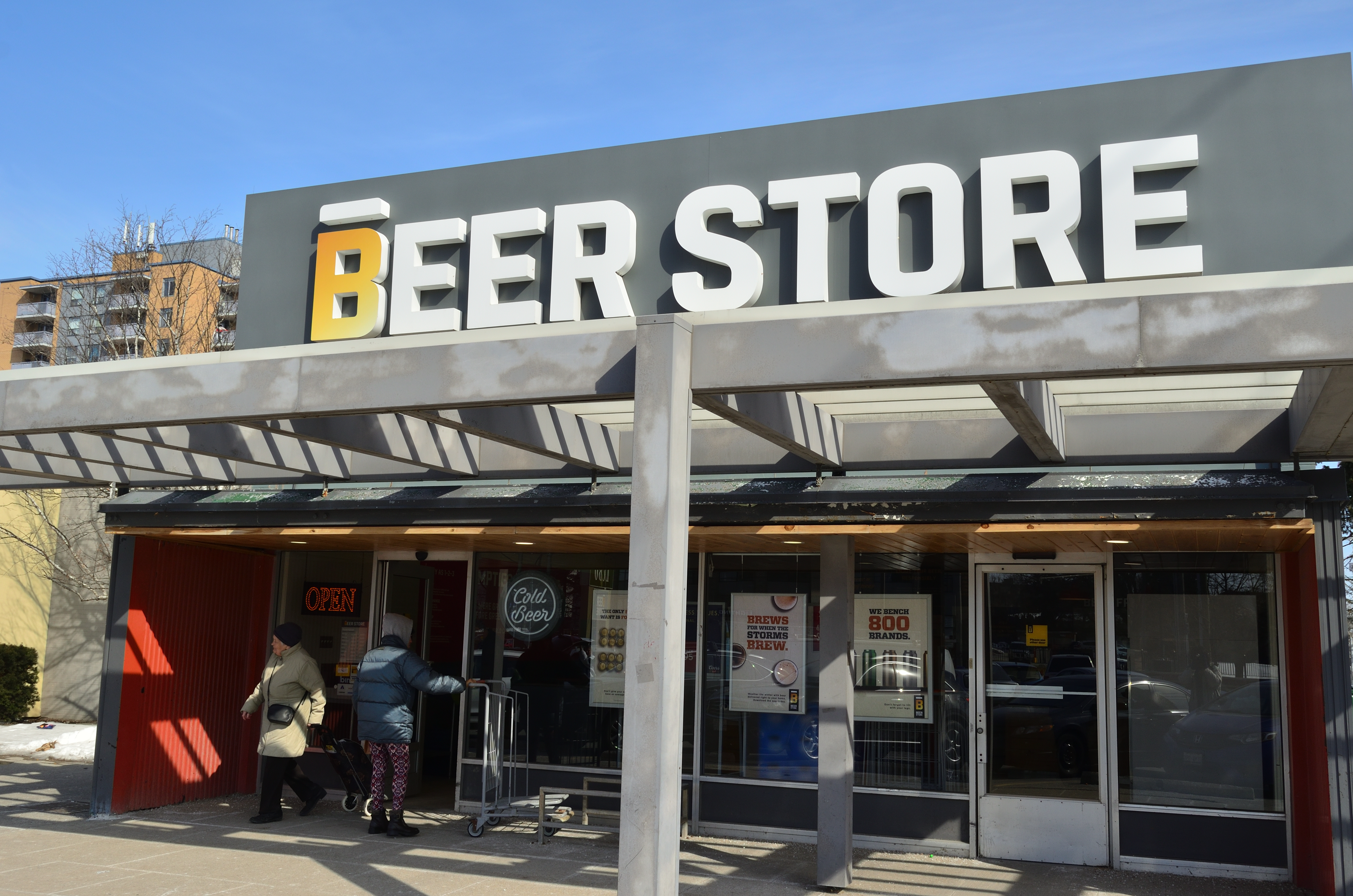
A Beer Store outlet in Richmond Hill, Ontario in 2020

The Beer Store follows an open ownership model whereby any qualifying brewer is allowed the opportunity to become a Beer Store shareholder, but three multi-nationals own the vast majority of shares: Molson-Coors, Labatt (owned by Anheuser-Busch InBev) and Sleeman (owned by Japan's Sapporo). Some smaller brewers also own shares, making the company a consortium of 30 Ontario based brewers. In order to qualify, the brewer must operate at least one facility in Ontario, conduct the full brewing process and sell beer through the corporation. Valid Ontario and Canadian manufacturing licenses are required and the brewer must not produce beer in any other jurisdiction, or else meet minimum annual capacity and production goals.

The Beer Store is governed by the Liquor Control Act (LCA) and is therefore regulated by the LCBO.

As of December 2016, the company operated over 450 retail stores which sell beer to the general public. The Beer Store (TBS) is the largest distributor of domestic beer in Ontario, selling to over 20,723 licensed customers. Although many imported beers are available at the Beer Store, the LCBO serves as the primary importer. Once imported, the product is then sold to the Beer Store for further distribution. As the primary retailer of Ontario, The Beer Store sells more than 720 brands of beer and over 1,000 home consumer beer selling units from 180 different brewers around the world. Larger Beer Store outlets typically stock around 600 beer selling units with the smallest Beer Stores stocking around 200 units.

TBS has a policy of accepting any brewer in the world to sell its product, as long as the brewer meets the requirements set by the LCBO. Furthermore, unlike many other retailers, a brewer is given flexibility with regards to how many and which stores it would like to sell its product in. Because The Beer Store operates on a cost-recovery basis, listing fees for smaller breweries can be kept at a minimum. In 2016 TBS implemented a new lower tier rate for qualifying small brewers that is significantly less than the basic service rate paid by the larger brewing companies. Smaller breweries who produce under 1,000,000 hectolitres a year of beer qualify for this lower tier rate on their first 50,000 hectolitres of beer produced that year. Additionally, qualifying small brewers who produce under 10,000 hectolitres a year are now provided with 2 free guaranteed product listings at 7 of their most proximate Beer Stores.

TBS employees have long been unionized and represented by United Food and Commercial Workers (UFCW) Local 12R24.

== History ==
The company began in 1927, with the end of prohibition in Ontario. Although prohibition had proven to be unsuccessful, the provincial government still needed to placate angry temperance advocates and agreed that beer would be sold through a single network of stores. However, the government did not want to operate this network itself (as was done in some other Canadian provinces), and so permitted brewers to organize the Brewers Warehousing Company Ltd., which later became Brewers Retail, which was then using The Beer Store brand as early as 1985 by the Bill Davis government.

== The Beer Store today ==
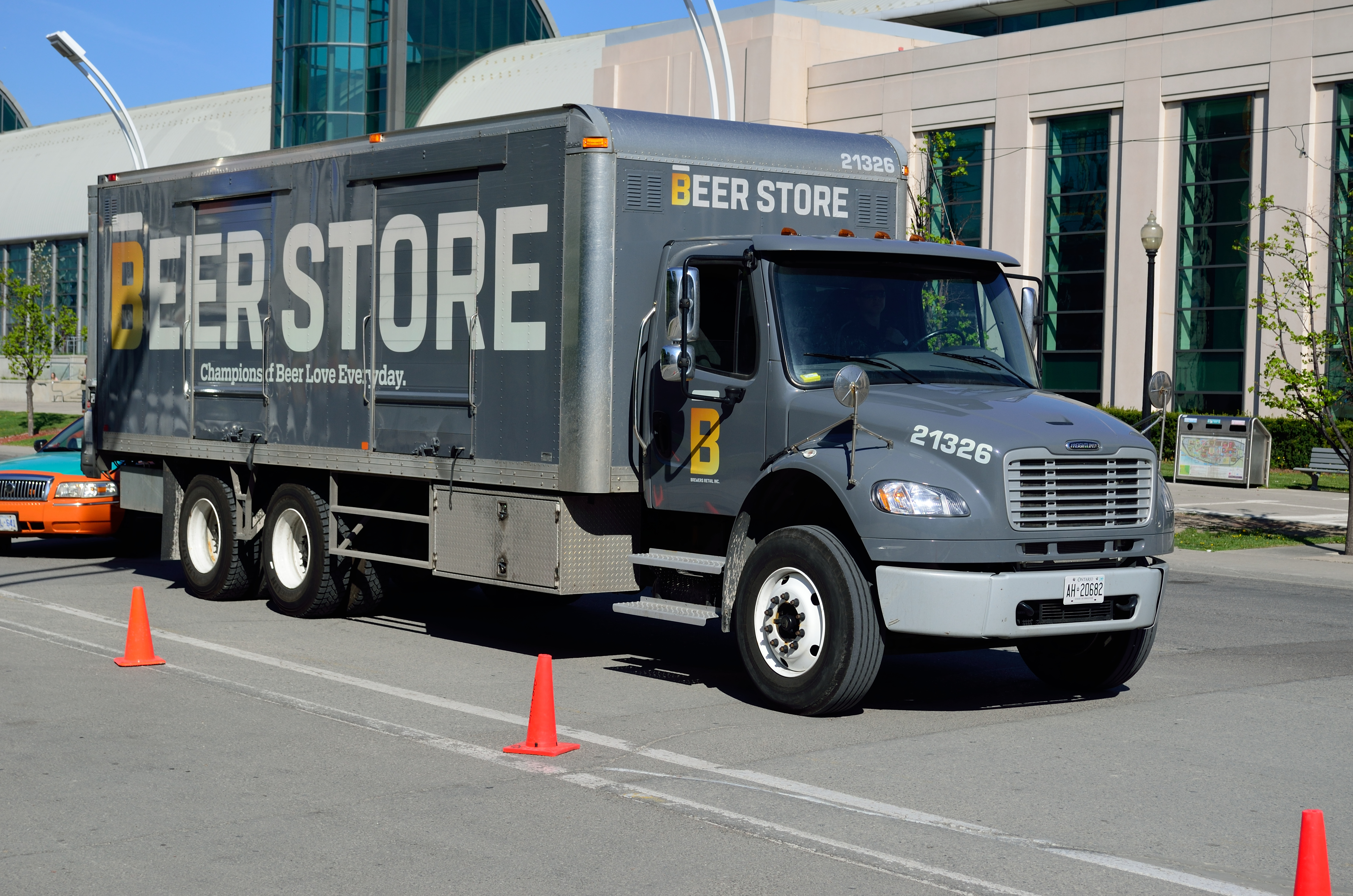
A truck for The Beer Store

=== Operating model and pricing ===
The Beer Store claims it operates on a self-sustaining basis as an efficient distributor and retailer of beer in the Province of Ontario. Operations take place on a fee for service basis, requiring brewers to pay a fee to sell their products through the Beer Store. The Beer Store publishes an annual rate sheet outlining their necessary financial requirements and consistency with annual budget and business plans.

The open nature of the Beer Store combined with pricing freedom for individual brewers is claimed to have created a highly competitive beer pricing market. The Beer Store processes hundreds of price changes every month and the average retail selling price in the system has only increased 2.8% from 2003 to 2014 while the general rate of Ontario inflation over the same period was approximately 20%. Ontario's uniform pricing regulation precludes price competition between beer retailers such as the LCBO and the Beer Store. Price competition between individual brewers and brands within the Beer Store system is claimed to be significant, but there is little real competition as there is little variance in price both over time and between brands of similar quality. The system does benefit remote areas in that lower-priced products are not restricted to larger outlets in urban centres, but are available at all Beer Store locations throughout the province. Hence rural consumers benefit as much (or as little) as urban consumers.

=== Estimated profits ===
The Beer Store states it operates as a not-for-profit entity. While this may be true, critics have argued that the TBS system is structured to support relatively high prices and profits of the breweries to the detriment of consumers. A series of studies, authored or co-authored by professor Anindya Sen of the University of Waterloo, estimated that the near-monopoly the Beer Store has in Ontario allows its owners to capture between $450 and $630 million in “additional profits” each year.

The first of the Sen studies was commissioned by the Ontario Convenience Store Association and surveyed six 24-pack domestic brands from IGA and Metro Quebec flyers compared to the same brands at The Beer Store in Ontario over a 22-week period in 2013. Sen corrected tax analysis associated with the original study and added three import brands from a Costco in Quebec in subsequent analysis. Correcting for tax differentials between the two provinces, positive price differences of $1.3 - $3.3 were found to exist between their average price of 24-bottle packs of brands including Molson Canadian, Molson Dry, Coors Light, Budweiser and Bud Light. Using Molson Canadian as an example, the adjusted 24 pack price from Quebec IGA and Metro flyers was found to be $26.81 versus $28.12 for Ontario TBS locations.

In response to Sen's analysis, The Beer Store commissioned a survey of Quebec – Ontario beer pricing by Debra Aron, an economist with Navigant Economics, which reviewed average TBS home consumer beer prices for all of 2013 in comparison to all beer sales at Quebec's seven largest grocery chains, utilizing Neilsen data, for the same period. Aron's study concluded that the average TBS beer prices, excluding all taxes, were 18% less than those at Quebec grocery stores in 2013 or on a per case basis approximately $4.40 less per case of 24 cans.

Reports from 2015 indicated that 80% of beer sales in Ontario were made at the 450 outlets of The Beer Store. An estimate published in 2017, provided this summary as to profitability, "Add the cost savings together with the extra market share and you get $396-million. That is how valuable The Beer Store is to its owners."

=== Green policies ===
Since 1927, the Beer Store has refunded deposits on all empty beer containers purchased in Ontario. In February 2007 the Ontario Deposit Return Program (ODRP) was launched by the Government of Ontario. The ODRP's goal is to ensure that 100 per cent of all packaging sold at the LCBO follows the same path of all packaging sold at the Beer Store, to be reused or recycled. All alcoholic beverage containers (over 100ml) purchased in Ontario are accepted for deposit return at any Beer Store location that returns empty containers. ODRP continues to make a meaningful contribution to Ontario's waste diversion objectives, with the return rate increasing more than 16 percentage points since its first year of operation in 2007. Between the ODRP and Blue Box, an estimated 63,909 additional tonnes of glass is being diverted from Ontario landfills. These materials continue to be directed toward higher-end recycling supporting Ontario's green economy and generating environmental benefits. “This success means we have recycling factories making new products, instead of higher piles of waste in landfills,” said Jim Bradley, Ontario Minister of the Environment, in an April 2014 statement. As a result of the ODRP, Ontario is now the principal source of quality glass cullet for Ontario glass manufacturing – previously Ontario glass manufacturers had to source glass cullet from other jurisdictions to support production. In 2013–2014, the Beer Store and ODRP program combined, avoided 196,332 tonnes of GHG emissions - equivalent to taking over 41,333 cars and trucks off Ontario roads. Combined, these programs avoided over 2,694,461 gigajoules of energy - equivalent to over $41 million of oil (Note ($94.73/barrel and 6.1 GJ/barrel of oil).

Between 2013 and 2014, the Beer Store achieved a system-wide recovery and re-use rate of 99 per cent for the industry standard bottles, which are reused 12 to 15 times. The Beer Store has received praise from local and national organizations including the Conservation Council of Ontario, Environmental Defence Canada, The Recycling Council of Ontario, and Toronto Environmental Alliance.

TBS’ recycling efforts translate into cost savings for municipal governments as municipalities need not spend tax revenue on recycling packaging that TBS sells. In 2008, TBS estimated that its return program has saved taxpayers $38 million in avoided waste management and recycling program costs per year. In 2012, the TBS estimated that savings had increased to $40 million with 94% of beer containers and 81% of LCBO containers recycled.

The Beer Store also is actively engaged in reducing its carbon footprint by finding innovative ways to reduce its energy consumption, a key input for any retail organization, especially one with a need to constantly refrigerate its product. A notable initiative is the use of outside air to cool beer when outside temperatures provide for such a tactic.

Pierre Sadik, Senior Policy Adviser at the David Suzuki Foundation has stated, "Ontarians should be proud of The Beer Store's environmental achievements. It's time businesses across the province follow The Beer Store's lead and turn their talk about waste diversion into real action."

Ontario's bottle deposit return program for beer containers had been operated by the Beer Store exclusively. In 2024, the Beer Store handled more than 1.6 billion bottle returns at its locations. Due to the reduction of beer store locations and the expanding sales of beer outside of TBS, on January 1, 2026, grocery stores that are larger than 4,000 square feet that have been licensed to sell alcohol will be required to accept returns and pay back deposits as a condition of keeping their liquor license. Retail grocery stores have objected to assuming the costs and logistics involved.

In November 2025, the Beer Store announced that it had reached an agreement-in-principle to allow grocery stores to refer customers to the nearest Beer Store outlet to return empty beer and wine bottles. Grocers who sign on to the agreement will pay 17 cents per container to The Beer Store and display signage advising customers to return empties to the nearest TBS outlet.

=== Corporate responsibility ===
TBS maintains a strict policy of “ID 30” and the right to refuse any customer who appears intoxicated or who is underage. Furthermore, TBS empowers its retail management to actively monitor and track every employee's refusal rate to ensure proper conformance to company policy. In 2017, TBS employee challenge and refusal rates are the following:

RETAIL BEER CHALLENGES AND REFUSALS CY17 | Jan 2017 – Dec 2017

1. Minors Challenged/asked to produce I.D: 3,388,975
2. Minors Refused service: 31,983
3. Intoxicants Challenged/suspected for being impaired (alcohol/drugs): 13,583
4. Intoxicants Refused service for impairment: 10,390

The Beer Store works closely with Police agencies across Ontario to report suspected impaired driving. Also Retail employees will work with the customer in finding other means of transportation(cab/transit/call a friend) home if suspected they are impaired and refused service, they go the extra step to make sure the customer will arrive alive and not just let them find a way home.

=== Returns for Leukemia ===
Since 2006 The Beer Store, UFCW Local 12R24 (the union representing its employees), and the Leukemia & Lymphoma Society of Canada have partnered together to help raise awareness and funds for blood cancer research through the collection of empty bottles. The bottle drive is formally called "Returns for Leukemia" but many refer to it as the "Leukemia Bottle Drive". It is held on the last Saturday of May and is also the world's largest bottle drive. Over the last 13 years, through donations of cash and empties, the event has raised over $15 million for the cause.

== Cancellation of contract ==
The Ontario government's plan to cancel the contract with The Beer Store as the sole seller of beer in packages exceeding six units, began with legislation tabled in late May 2019. (The ten year "Master Framework Agreement" was signed in 2015 by the government in power at the time.) The plan has led to some concern, with certain industry sources suggesting that the company will be entitled to significant damages, up to one billion dollars according to some estimates; if so, that would be costly for the taxpayer. The government believes that the cancellation is important but has not addressed the concerns raised by the industry. Finance Minister Vic Fedeli told the news media that the current monopoly on beer sales in bulk "is a bad deal for consumers and businesses and is deeply unfair to the people of Ontario".

TBS president Ted Moroz issued this statement: "The government cannot extinguish our right to damages as outlined in the Master Framework Agreement. It is critical to understand that The Beer Store has, in good faith, based on a legally-negotiated 10-year operating agreement with the Province of Ontario, invested more than $100 million to modernize its stores and to continue to upgrade the consumer experience. [We] will fight this legislation vigorously through the courts...". John Nock of the United Food and Commercial Workers union made this statement, "We will fight this government and this premier to keep our jobs and to save the taxpayers the billions Ford is willing to pay to put beer in corner stores".

Ontario Chamber of Commerce President Rocco Rossi wrote to Fedeli stating that the plan to cancel the contract with TBS was a "short-sighted approach" that could lead to other corporations refusing to contract with the Province. Fedeli dismissed suggestions that the government might be required to pay up to $1 billion as a result of cancelling the contract at this time.

The previous government had approved the sale of beer in six packs or less in a limited number of supermarkets in 2018 but the plan to cancel the contract with TBS would provide greater "choice and convenience" according to Fedeli. The government passed legislation to cancel the contract in early June but did not immediately proclaim it into law, because negotiations were continuing with TBS about the cancellation process. TBS Board chair Charlie Angelakos believed that negotiations could lead to a "mutually acceptable" method of increasing the availability of beer in retail locations and could prevent a "protracted legal battle and the significant damages to which the government would be exposed".

In May 2024, the Ford government announced an agreement to terminate its contract with the Beer Store a year early at a cost of at least $225 million in payments to the Beer Store as part of a plan to expand beer sales, and sales of some alcohol products, in grocery stores, corner stores, gas stations, and big box retailers. The Opposition Liberals claimed the plan would cost taxpayers in excess of $1 billion in fees, incentive payments to grocery stores, and lost tax revenue.

Initially, expanded beer and alcohol sales were to start in January 2026, but in August 2024 it was announced that corner stores would begin being able to sell alcohol in September 2024. According to the government's Fall Economic Statement released at the end of October 2024, the Beer Store's share of provincial alcohol sales is projected to fall from a 41% market share in 2024 to a 15% share by 2026-27. At its peak, the Beer Store/Brewers' Retail had been responsible for 90% of Ontario's beer market.

=== Closures ===
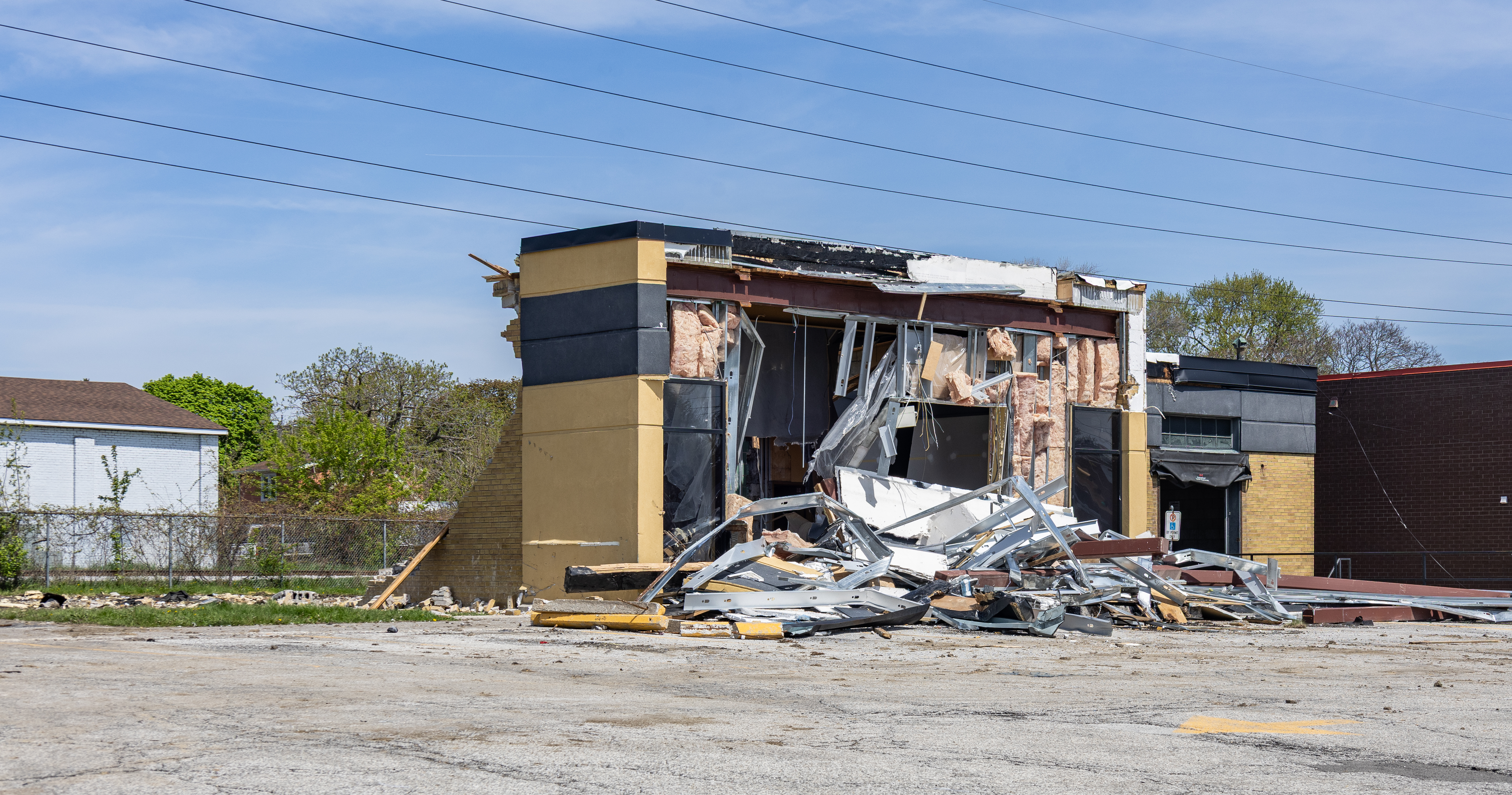
Demolishment of a closed The Beer Store branch

The Beer Store operated 438 locations at the time the cancellation of the Master Framework Agreement was announced. With the fall in market share since the announcement of the agreement's cancellation in May 2024, The Beer Store has closed 120 locations, with 70 closures between May 2024 and late June 2025, and a further 50 closed by November 16, 2025. A further 18 closures could occur by the end of 2025, under the terms of the province's agreement with TBS. Up to 138 stores are expected to close by the end of 2025 with more closures expected in 2026 as the number of convenience stores licensed to sell beer expands and as the requirement that at least 300 Beer Store outlets remain operational expires at the end of 2025.

== Criticism ==
=== Brewer neutrality ===
The Beer Store employees are not allowed to recommend one brand over another. Staff can tell customers about the products but cannot encourage customers to choose a specific brand. This policy is known as brewer neutrality. The Beer Store is permitted to charge non-shareholding breweries listing fees, for each beer carried in stock, that many critics perceive as substantial.

=== Consumer prices ===
Critics say TBS constitutes a foreign-owned monopoly over retail beer sales in Ontario, costing the consumer more in the long run in terms of convenience and price. Critics also state that if retail beer sales were opened up, then the average price to the consumer would drop due to competition within the marketplace. TBS has argued that the price of beer will increase if privatization occurs and points to the situations of BC and Alberta as prime examples. In an independent report titled “Alcohol Retailing Deregulation: Implications for Ontario” by economist Greg Flanagan, it was demonstrated that the general consequence of deregulating the sale of alcohol is an increase in average sale price. Since Alberta's deregulation of alcohol in 1993, their retail alcohol price rises have since tripled Ontario's (28.2% vs 9.2%). By accounting for tax differentials and comparing the average (non-sale) 24 pack cost of beer between BC, Alberta, Quebec and Ontario, the report concludes stating that Ontarians are well served under the current regulated model.

=== Political controversy ===
The Beer Store has been subject to criticism following the Molson-Coors merger, whose 49% stake in TBS was the last 100% Canadian-owned share of the venture under the pre-merger Molson Breweries. In 2005, Ontario's alcohol laws were reviewed and proposals to allow the sale of beer in grocery and convenience stores were put forth. A report called the Beverage Alcohol System Review was released on March 24, 2005, by the Ontario Government. However, the report's findings dealt centrally with the LCBO and the economic and social impact of its privatization.

An online petition was started by a private citizen, Derek Forward, to ask the provincial government to end the monopoly enjoyed by the Beer Store. The petition has received coverage in the Toronto Star, and has generated enough support to allow it to be formally presented to the provincial legislature in the fall of 2008 for consideration (petition No. P–146: "Practice and arrangement of retailing beer"). However, on December 9, 2008, the Ontario government dismissed the petition citing the effectiveness of the TBS system.

At the start of the 2007 provincial election campaign, The Brick Brewing Company of Waterloo (later renamed Waterloo Brewing Company and purchased by Carlsberg Group) made headlines when it claimed The Beer Store engaged in a number of discriminatory practices and policies, such as restrictions on price advertising, for causing a decline in company sales. TBS representatives denied that their policies are hurting small brewers and implicitly questioned the timing of the Brick Brewing Company's statement, suggesting that in their view it is unethical for a brewery to use an electoral campaign to forward self-interests. Additionally, Brick claimed that TBS allegedly used monopolistic tactics to force the brewer to stop offering beer in "stubbies" by withholding supplies of industry standard "long-necked" bottles. The Beer Store claimed that Brick signed an agreement in 1992 to use the industry-standard bottle and Brick said it never signed such an agreement. This dispute was settled out of court with the terms of the settlement undisclosed. Brick has since stopped selling beer in "stubbies" because the cost was too high.

A July 2008 Toronto Star article attributed an industry analyst as estimating the three foreign entities that owned TBS earned $1 billion in profit per year in Canada.

Ontario Craft Brewers is the main lobby group for Ontario's smaller brewers, and has been increasingly critical of BRI/TBS. The 29 OCB members currently employ several thousand Ontarians. OCB wants to either acquire shares in TBS or be permitted to set up their own competing chain. Premier McGuinty responded by saying that his government would not consider any application to form a competing chain, and that his government would not consider compelling TBS shareholders to sell any shares, although some Liberal and Conservative backbenchers have said they would expect BRI to at least negotiate in good faith with craft brewers who made a serious offer. BRI responded by saying that it was not considering and would not consider selling shares at any price, and that they do more than enough to accommodate non-shareholding brewers already. Canada's National Brewers (the lobby group that represents the BRI shareholders) further said that in the event OCB did get to set up a competing chain, they would refuse to stock their products there.

In February 2012, the website Canadian Beer News reported that The Beer Store has made thousands of dollars' worth of political donations to the British Columbia Liberal Party and British Columbia New Democratic Party. The report noted that it was odd for an Ontario-based company to be making such large donations to political parties in another province, and suggested that the co-owning breweries were funnelling this money through The Beer Store in an attempt to put pressure on the BC government to give their brands favourable placements in BC Liquor stores.

In 2015, it signed a contract "Master Framework Agreement" with the Government of Ontario which required the company to "improve the customer experience" in its retail outlets. The contract expires in 2025, limits the number of retail outlets permitted to sell beer, and specifies the company will receive a monetary award for breach of contract even if the breach results from a change in government legislation.

=== Non-competitive business practices ===
On December 9, 2014, Toronto Star investigative journalist Martin Regg Cohn exposed an agreement between The Beer Store and the LCBO to limit competition, by ensuring that the LCBO would not offer beer products in 12 or 24-pack cases, it would not sell major brands to restaurants or bars, and would inform the Beer Store of any store it was planning to open in a new community. The document, dated, June 1, 2000, and provided to him by a whistleblower, was signed by then head of the LCBO Andy Brandt and head of BRI Daver Perkins, of which a copy was sent to Ministry of Consumer & Commercial Relations Deputy Minister Sandra Lang.

In a 2014 report to the government on maximizing assets, former TD Bank CEO Ed Clark stated that the LCBO (and the Government of Ontario) forgoes $515 million of revenue by not allowing sales of larger format beer packages and forgoes $500 million of revenue by not selling major brands to restaurants. Andy Brandt, former highly successful head of the LCBO, was very critical of the agreement, and says it was forced upon him by the then Mike Harris Progressive Conservative government. When Regg Cohn questioned the Beer Store representatives about the agreement, suggesting it is collusion, the reply from the BRI lawyer Michael A. Eizenga of Bennett Jones LLP stated the "use of the term 'collusion' which has significant legal meaning," and "This is an inaccurate and inappropriate characterization, to which my client objects."

Liberal Finance Minister Charles Sousa, in response to these revelations, says he has "got the investigation underway" and that "I'm trying to ensure that what you’re suggesting doesn’t happen any further ... You're right, there's a monopoly, a duopoly, oligopoly — call it what you will."

On December 10, 2014, Restaurants Canada filed an official complaint with the Competition Bureau. "'We did not know the depth of the complicity,' it said, pointing to 'new and disturbing information' in the Star that detailed price gouging of restaurants and bars forced to buy from The Beer Store ... A Competition Bureau spokesperson said it is 'reviewing it to determine whether the conduct in question could raise concerns under the criminal or civil provisions in the Competition Act.'"

On April 15, 2015, Premier of Ontario Kathleen Wynne announced the Master Framework Agreement—a 10-year agreement with The Beer Store allowing changes to provincial liquor laws that would, among other changes, allow up to 450 supermarkets in "urban population centres" (roughly equating the number of Beer Store locations) to be authorized to sell beer subject to conditions, require The Beer Store to improve the placement and marketing of Ontario craft brews, and allow LCBO locations to trial carrying 12-packs. Wynne stated that The Beer Store had become a "de-facto monopoly controlled by a small number of companies". The new regulations took effect on December 15, 2015, with 58 designated supermarkets, and additional locations to be added in the future; all products must be below 7.1% alcohol by volume, and at least 20% of a store's stock must be Ontario craft brews. Loblaw Companies elected to go beyond the minimum quota and committed to stock 50% Ontario craft brews at its participating stores, in an effort to provide a wider array of options.

Current premier Doug Ford is a supporter of private liquor sales. On May 27, 2019, Minister of Finance Vic Fedeli tabled legislation proposing the unwinding of the Master Framework Agreement. Fedeli described the MFA as a "sweetheart deal by the previous government" for "three global giants" who were "more interested in protecting profits than providing convenience or choice for average people."

== In popular culture ==
In the film Strange Brew the McKenzie Brothers visit a Brewers Retail store demanding a refund after they attempt to return a bottle of beer that contained a mouse (the mouse was however placed in the bottle by the brothers). Due to the nature of the scene, Brewers Retail refused to allow the use of one of their actual stores for the filming, and also refused to allow the use of the name "Brewers Retail". In response, the filmmakers built their own replica store, and called it "The Beer Store". Coincidentally, several years later, Brewers Retail changed the name of its stores to "The Beer Store", and they continue to operate under this name.

The Beer Store was also showcased in episodes of Late Night with Conan O'Brien during O'Brien's week-long tenure in Toronto during the week of February 10, 2004.

== Related companies ==
Brewers' Distributor Ltd. (BDL) operates in Western Canada and is owned by Anheuser-Busch InBev and Molson-Coors (Sleeman has its own distribution operation in the West). Unlike BRI, BDL only warehouses and distributes beer and is not in the retail business.
