= Brewers' Distributor =

Canadian beer distribution company

Brewers' Distributor Limited
- Company type: Joint venture
- Industry: Beer distribution
- Predecessors: Pacific Brewers Distribution, Alberta Brewers Agents, Saskatchewan Brewers Association, Associated Beer Distributors
- Founded: 1970; 55 years ago
- Headquarters: Calgary, Alberta, Canada
- Area served: Alberta, British Columbia, Manitoba, Northwest Territories, Nunavut, Saskatchewan, Yukon
- Parent: AB InBev and Molson Coors
- Website: bdl.ca

Brewers' Distributor Ltd. (BDL) is a Canadian company that distributes beer throughout the four western provinces and three northern territories. It is a private joint venture company owned by AB InBev (parent company of Labatt Breweries) and Molson-Coors (parent company of Molson Breweries). BDL operates nine distribution centres and four cross dock facilities in Alberta, British Columbia, Manitoba and Saskatchewan. Its head office is located in Calgary, Alberta.

Although BDL distributes the vast majority of beer sold in Western Canada, it has not been granted any de jure monopoly by any provincial government. Other Canadian breweries are free to distribute their own beer if they wish – some non-shareholders (such as Big Rock in Calgary and Sleeman Breweries in Guelph, Ontario (itself a division of Sapporo)) have their own distribution chains, although others voluntarily use BDL. The company has been permitted to distribute some brands of imported beer since 2001, except in Alberta, where the exclusive right to distribute imported beer belongs to Connect Logistics Services.

== History ==
The company was established in 1995 when Pacific Brewers Distributor in British Columbia, Alberta Brewers Agents, Saskatchewan Brewers Association and Associated Beer Distributors in Manitoba (all of which were owned, or largely, owned by the two present shareholders) were consolidated into a single operation.

On March 25, 2020, BDL suffered a cyberattack that resulted in numerous weeks of beer shortages for distributors.

== Relationship to Brewers Retail Inc. ==
There are key differences between BDL and Brewers Retail Inc., which operates The Beer Store in Ontario with nearly the same shareholders and a similar near-monopoly.

- BDL does not operate in Ontario, while Brewers Retail operates only in Ontario.
- BDL only provides warehousing and distribution services and does not sell to consumers, while Brewers Retail does.
- BDL is owned by AB InBev and Molson Coors exclusively, while Brewers Retail is owned by AB InBev, Molson Coors, Sapporo (these three companies hold the vast majority of shares), and other smaller Ontario brewers.
- Brewers Retail stocks imported beer at The Beer Store, but this beer is purchased through the Liquor Control Board of Ontario (LCBO).

== Distribution of other alcoholic beverages ==
BDL does not distribute wine or distilled spirits in any province. In most provinces and territories, these are distributed by their respective government-owned liquor corporations, while in Alberta the AGLC outsources its distribution to Connect Logistics Services.
