= Labatt Brewing Company =

Canadian brewer

Labatt Brewing Company Limited
- Formerly: John Labatt Limited (1911-1995)
- Type: Subsidiary
- Industry: Alcoholic drink
- Founded: 1847
- Founder: John Kinder Labatt
- Headquarters: Toronto, Ontario, Canada
- Number of locations: Six (London, St. John’s, Montreal, Halifax, Creston, Edmonton)
- Key people: Marcelo (Mika) Michaelis
- Products: Beer
- Parent: Anheuser-Busch InBev
- Subsidiaries: The Beer Store (49%), Brewers' Distributors Limited (50%)
- Website: www.labatt.com

Labatt Brewing Company Limited (French: La Brasserie Labatt Limitée) is a Canadian brewery headquartered in Toronto, Ontario. Founded in 1847, Labatt is the largest brewer in Canada.

In 1995, it was purchased by Belgian brewer Interbrew. In 2004, Interbrew merged with Brazilian brewer AmBev to form InBev. In 2008, InBev merged with American brewer Anheuser-Busch to form Anheuser-Busch InBev (abbreviated as AB InBev), making Labatt part of Anheuser-Busch InBev. On October 10, 2016, an over $100 billion merger between Anheuser-Busch InBev and SABMiller closed. Labatt is now part of the new company, Anheuser-Busch InBev SA/NV, which is trading as BUD on the New York Stock Exchange (ABI:BB in Brussels).

In the United States, Labatt brand beers are sold under licence by Labatt USA. Since 2009, it has been fully independent of the Canadian firm; it is a subsidiary of the privately held FIFCO USA of Rochester, New York.

== History ==
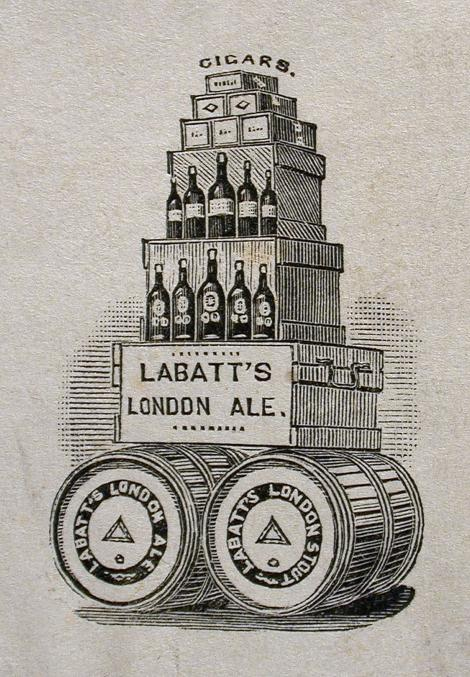
Early advertisement

Labatt Breweries was founded by John Kinder Labatt in 1847 in London, Canada West (now Ontario). Kinder had immigrated to Canada from Ireland in the 1830s and initially established himself as a farmer near London. In 1847, he invested in a brewery with a partner, Samuel Eccles, launching "Labatt and Eccles". When Eccles retired in 1854, Labatt acquired his interest and renamed the firm the "London Brewery". He was assisted by his sons Ephraim, Robert and John.

When John Kinder Labatt died in 1866, his son John assumed control of the company. Under his supervision, it grew to be the largest brewery in Canada. Following his death in 1915, the company was controlled by a trust operated by his nine children, although his sons John Sackville Labatt and Hugh Francis Labatt assumed managerial control.

In 1901, Prohibition in Canada began through provincial legislation in Prince Edward Island. In 1916, prohibition was instituted in Ontario as well, affecting all 64 breweries in the province. Although some provinces totally banned alcohol manufacture, some permitted production for export to the United States. Labatt survived by producing full strength beer for export south of the border and by introducing two "temperance ales" with less than two per cent alcohol for sale in Ontario. However, the Canadian beer industry suffered a second blow when Prohibition in the United States began in 1919. When Prohibition was repealed in Ontario in 1926, just 15 breweries remained, and only Labatt retained its original management. This resulted in a strengthened industry position. In 1945, Labatt became a publicly traded company with the issuance of 900,000 shares.

John and Hugh Labatt, grandsons of founder John K. Labatt, launched Labatt 50 in 1950 to commemorate 50 years of partnership. The first light ale introduced in Canada, Labatt 50 was Canada's best-selling beer until 1979.

By the 1960s, both John S. Labatt and Hugh Labatt were deceased, and John Moore was Labatt's president, with the Labatt family holding a controlling interest. In 1964, the Schlitz brewing company of the US purchased majority control of Labatt in a friendly takeover. Their ownership of Labatt was short-lived, as Labatt's holdings in the United States along with those of Schlitz constituted an anti-trust position in California. By 1966, Schlitz sold its interest to a group led by Moore, putting it back under Canadian ownership.

In 1951, Labatt launched its Pilsener Lager; when it was introduced in Manitoba, the beer was nicknamed "Blue" for the colour of its label and the company's support of Winnipeg's Canadian Football League (CFL) franchise, the Blue Bombers. The brew-master at the time was Robert Frank Lewarne (b. 1921 Toronto; R. F. Lewarne also headed the team that produced the famous Labatt 50, mainly for the Quebec market). The new name allowed Labatt to play to their Western base while sidestepping the politics of “red and white” which was prominent and fueled by “British” versus “Canadian” nationalism in the 1960s. The nickname "Blue" stuck and in 1979, Labatt Blue claimed the top spot in the Canadian beer market. It lost this status in the late eighties to Molson Canadian, but over the next decade, it periodically regained the top spot as consumer preferences fluctuated. In 2004, Budweiser took the top spot, pushing Blue to third for the first time in twenty-five years. However, since Labatt has brewed Budweiser (and other Anheuser-Busch products) in Canada under licence since the 1980s, Labatt likely did not suffer from this shift. Moreover, Labatt Blue remains the best selling Canadian beer in the world, based upon worldwide sales.

Labatt was also the majority owner of the Toronto Blue Jays from their inception in 1976 until 1995, when Interbrew purchased Labatt. In 2000, Rogers Communications purchased an 80% stake in the team and Interbrew retained the other 20%; Rogers later acquired full ownership of the team.

Labatt's innovations include the introduction of the first twist-off cap on a refillable bottle in 1984. In 1989, Labatt had the opportunity to hire Canadian model Pamela Anderson as a Labatt's Blue Zone Girl after she was picked out of the crowd by a TV camera man at a BC Lions football game wearing a Blue Zone crop-top. Photographer and boyfriend Dann Ilicic produced the Blue Zone Girl poster on his own after Labatt's refused to have anything to do with it. Later, Labatt's did buy 1000 posters to deal with consumer demand.

In 1995, Labatt was acquired by the large Belgian multinational brewer Interbrew (now InBev), the world market leader. Labatt is part-owner of Brewers Retail Inc., operator of The Beer Store retail chain, which—protected by legislation—has over 90% market share of Ontario off-premises beer sales.

The company also operated its broadcasting assets through Labatt Communications, namely The Sports Network and Discovery Channel. Labbatt Communications was spun out from Labbatt to form NetStar Communications in 1995 which was owned by multiple Canadian investors and ESPN Inc.; NetStar would later be acquired outright by CTV Inc. (formerly Baton Broadcasting) in 2000, which was then sold to BCE Inc. to form Bell Globemedia, who would later renamed to CTVglobemedia and now Bell Media.

In early 2007, Labatt also acquired Lakeport Brewing Company of Hamilton, Ontario., Two years later, in 2009, the company sold Labatt USA, including the American rights to its core Labatt products (such as Blue, Blue Light, and Labatt 50) to FIFCO USA, and agreed to brew those brands on Labatt USA's behalf until 2012. This sale was mandated by the U.S. Department of Justice for competitive reasons following InBev's merger with Anheuser-Busch, since Budweiser and Labatt Blue were both among the top brands in upstate New York, despite the latter having less than 1% market share in the U.S. overall.

The sale did not include U.S. rights to Labatt products not carrying the "Labatt" label, such as Kokanee or Alexander Keith's, which are now distributed in the U.S. by Anheuser-Busch. Moreover, the underlying intellectual property (such as the Labatt trademarks) remains the property of the Canadian firm. Finally, the sale did not affect Labatt's Canadian operations in any way, however Anheuser-Busch InBev retains full control of the Labatt brand portfolio within Canada.

In 2020, Labatt acquired Canadian distiller Goodridge & Williams, a company known for creating Nütrl Vodka Soda and other ready-to-drink (RTD) canned cocktails.

== Operations ==
Canada

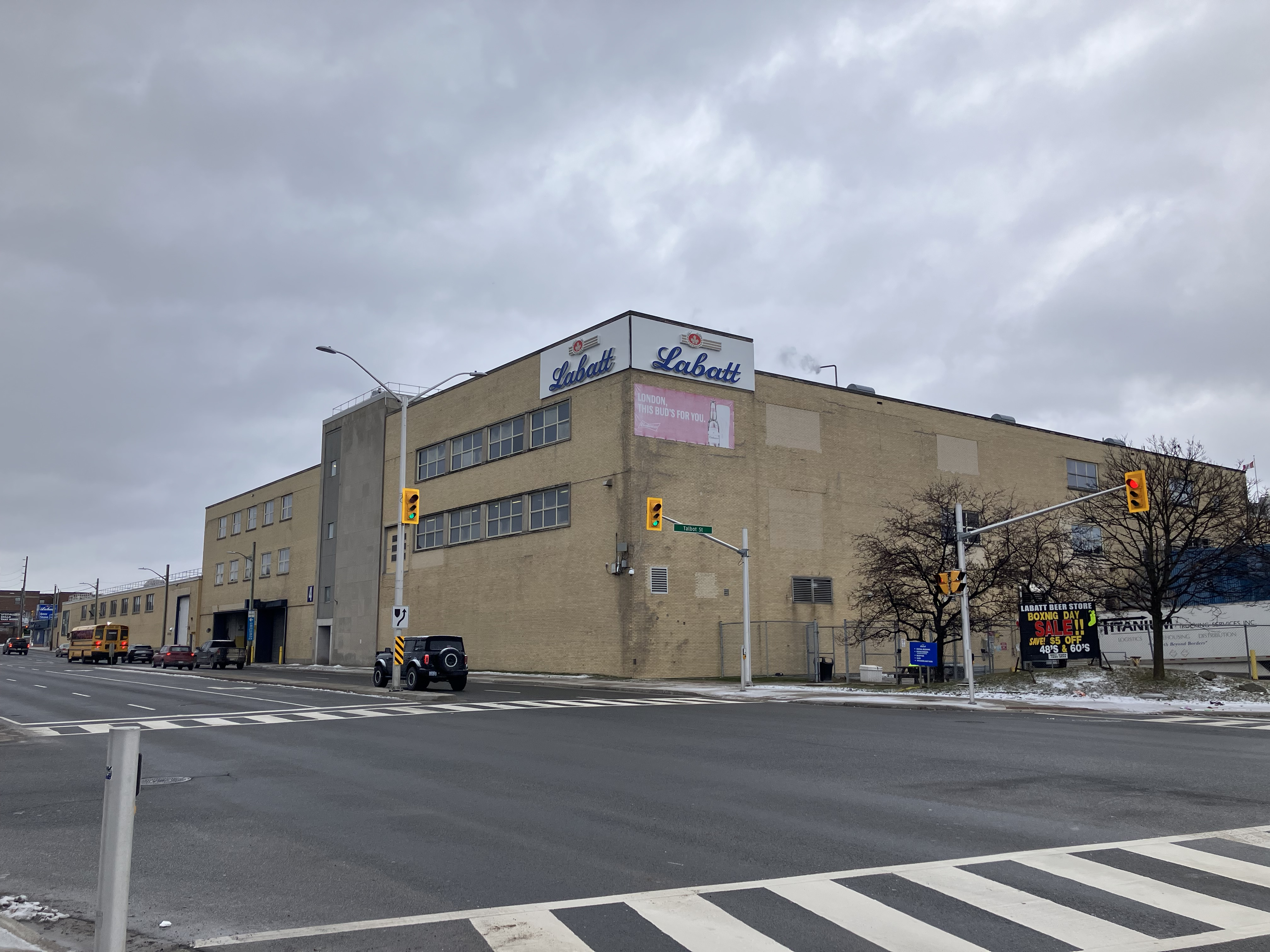
Labatt Brewery Operation in London, Ontario

- London, Ontario
- St. John's, Newfoundland and Labrador
- Montreal, Quebec (in the LaSalle borough)
- Halifax, Nova Scotia
- Creston, British Columbia
- Edmonton, Alberta

United States (previous to sale)

- Buffalo, New York (original and current United States Headquarters)
- Norwalk, Connecticut (former US headquarters)

Labatt's US headquarters were originally located in Buffalo for some years. Labatt then decided to relocate their headquarters to Norwalk, Connecticut, for a time. In 2007 Labatt decided to relocate their US operations back to Buffalo due to strong sales in the city and closer proximity to their Ontario operations. Labatt USA is now owned by FIFCO USA of Rochester, New York.

Labatt's Toronto (Rexdale) brewery was built in 1970. It ceased operations in 2005 and was demolished by 2007, thus ending the brewery's ties to the city.

== Brands ==
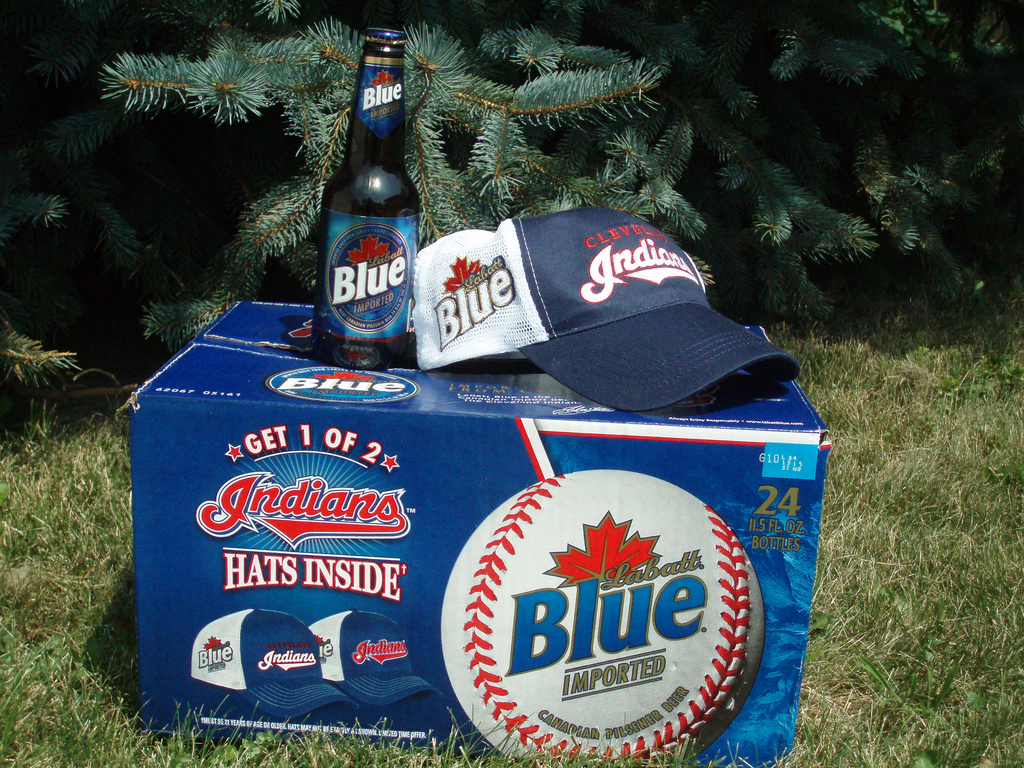
A case of Labatt Blue sold in the United States. Note the 'Imported' label.

Labatt 50 is a 5% abv ale launched in 1950 to commemorate 50 years of partnership between the grandsons of the brewer's founder. The first light-tasting ale introduced in Canada, Labatt 50 was Canada's best-selling beer until 1979, when, with the increasing popularity of lagers, it was surpassed by Labatt Blue. Labatt 50 is fermented using a special ale yeast, in use at Labatt since 1933.

Labatt Blue is a 5% abv pale lager. There are 12 imperial fluid ounces (341 mL) of beer in a bottle of Labatt Blue. There are 355 mL of beer in a standard can of Labatt Blue/Bleue in Canada with other volumes available in specific regions of the country.

In Quebec, Labatt also produces a stronger lager, Labatt Bleue Dry, at 6.1%.

In 2003, Labatt Blue received a Gold Quality Award at the World Quality Selections, organized yearly by Monde Selection.

Labatt had patented a specific method for making ice beer in 1997, 1998 and 2000: "A process for chill-treating, which is exemplified by a process for preparing a fermented malt beverage wherein brewing materials are mashed with water and the resulting mash is heated and wort separated therefrom. The wort is boiled, cooled and fermented, and the beer is subjected to a finishing stage, which includes aging, to produce the final beverage. The improvement comprises subjecting the beer to a cold stage comprising rapidly cooling the beer to a temperature of about its freezing point in such a manner that ice crystals are formed therein in only minimal amounts. The resulting cooled beer is then mixed for a short period of time with a beer slurry containing ice crystals, without any appreciable collateral increase in the amount of ice crystals in the resulting mixture. Finally, the so-treated beer is extracted from the mixture." The company provides the following explanation about Labatt Ice and Maximum Ice for the layman: "During this unique process, the temperature is reduced until fine ice crystals form in the beer. Then using an exclusive process, the crystals are removed. The result is a full flavor balanced beer."

== Corporate activities ==
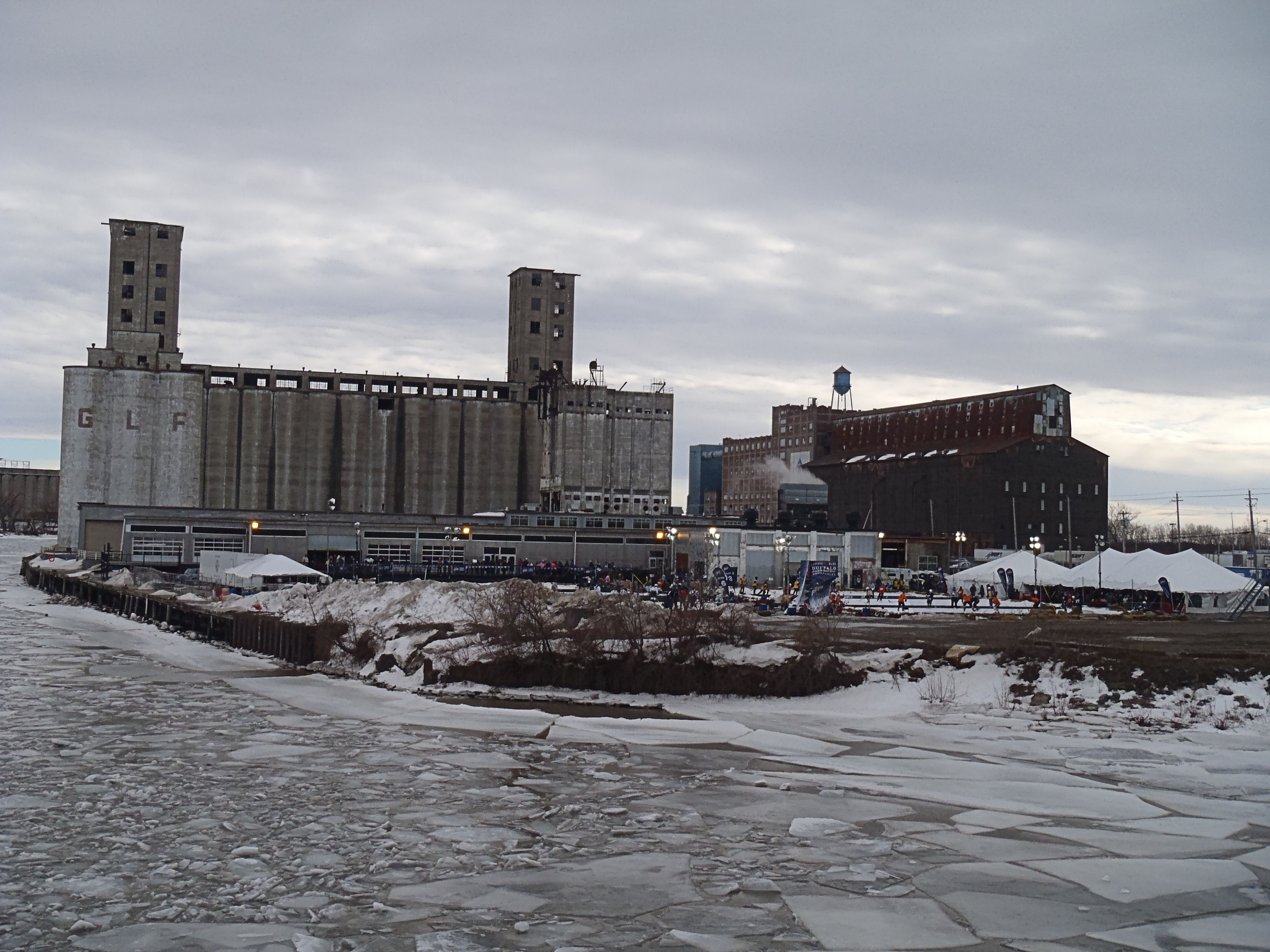
Labatt Blue Pond Hockey tournament at Buffalo RiverWorks, 2014

Labatt has sponsored the construction of many buildings in London, including Labatt Park, the John Labatt Centre, and the John Labatt Visual Arts Centre at the University of Western Ontario (UWO). Bessie Labatt's son Arthur Labatt was the 19th chancellor of UWO (2004–2008). In 1998 Labatt announced a 20-year sponsorship agreement with the now defunct Montreal Expos (now the Washington Nationals), which included naming rights for a downtown Montreal ballpark that was never built.

They sponsored the English football team Nottingham Forest F.C. from 1992 (interchanging with Shipstones Brewery until 1994) to 1997.

They also are the official beer and corporate sponsor of the OHL hockey franchise Plymouth Whalers. In the 1950s, the company sponsored a PGA Tour golf tournament, the Labatt Open.

Labatt sponsored Gilles Villeneuve as well as being the main sponsor of the Formula One Canadian Grand Prix from 1972 to 1986, as well as Williams F1 racing team from 1991 to 1994.

In 1983–1986, Labatt sponsored Ken Westerfield, Canadian Frisbee champion and world record holder, to perform Frisbee shows throughout Ontario, as well as sponsor the World Guts (Frisbee) Championships on Toronto Islands in 1986.

== Marketing ==
Labatt Blue is sold in all provinces of Canada and is also commonly sold in the United States; however, in Quebec it is sold under the French name Labatt Bleue, with a fleur-de-lis logo. Aside from the name, and containing 4.9% alcohol/volume instead of 5.0%, the red maple leaf on the logo has also been changed to a stylized red sheaf of wheat, which Labatt calls its symbol of "brewing quality."

== Arms ==
Coat of arms of Labatt Brewing Company

Notes
Granted 15 June 2017.
Crest
A Labatt Streamliner truck affronty Proper.
Escutcheon
Or an arrowhead Gules double-fimbriated Argent and Sable between three hops Proper.
Supporters
On a mount of barley Or issuant from barry wavy Argent and Azure two Budweiser Clydesdale horses each resting its interior hind leg on a beer barrel fesswise Proper.
Motto
Through Partnership And Perseverance

== In media ==
- Under the Influence: Beer is to Canada as wine is to France. How Labatt and its allies brewed up a nation of beer drinkers. Smithsonian Channel. June 30, 2013.

== See also ==
- Beer in Canada
- The Beer Store, beer retailer in Ontario
- Brewers' Distributor, beer distributor in Western Canada
- Ice beer
