= Nunavut Liquor and Cannabis Commission =

Government commission in Canada

- Company type: Agency
- Industry: Beverages
- Founded: Rankin Inlet (1999)
- Headquarters: Rankin Inlet, Canada
- Key people: Chris D'Arcy, Assistant Deputy Minister of Finance – Financial Management
- Products: Alcoholic beverages; Cannabis
- Revenue: CAD1,173,760 (2009)
- Number of employees: 17
- Website: The Nunavut Liquor and Cannabis Commission

The Nunavut Liquor and Cannabis Commission regulates the distribution, purchase and sale of alcoholic beverages and cannabis in the Canadian territory of Nunavut. The retail arms is referred to as Nunavut Liquor Management. It is the smallest and newest liquor control agency in Canada.

The Agency came into existence as a result of the creation of Nunavut and transfer of responsibility for liquor control under the territory's Liquor Act. From 1999 to 2005 the Northwest Territories Liquor Commission was responsible for liquor control and sales. The agency currently has two warehouses and, as of September 2017, one beer and wine store in Iqaluit. In 2018 or 2019, following national cannabis legalization, it was renamed to Nunavut Liquor and Cannabis Commission.

With no retail locations outside of Iqaluit, alcohol purchases are made by mail order to the agency and are flown to the locations across Nunavut. Individuals require a permit to order and ship liquor into Nunavut. It also provides licensed premises in Cambridge Bay, Rankin Inlet, and Iqaluit. Bulk orders from breweries are not permitted.

The tight restrictions on liquor access have not prevented bootlegging and drinking problems in the territory.
