= Northwest Territories Liquor and Cannabis Commission =

- Industry: Alcoholic beverages and cannabis products
- Founded: Yellowknife (1983)
- Headquarters: Hay River, Canada
- Products: Alcoholic beverages
- Website: Official website

The Northwest Territories Liquor and Cannabis Commission (French: Sociéte des alcools et du cannabis des Territoires du Nord-Ouest) regulates the distribution, purchase and sale of alcoholic beverages and cannabis products in the Northwest Territories.

The Commission came into existence as a result of amendments to the Liquor Act. It currently has contracts with local operators for the operation of seven liquor stores and one warehouse.

The liquor commission previously enforced limits placed by the communities of Fort Simpson on liquor sales, but these were lifted in 2021.

Operations in Nunavut were transferred to the Nunavut Liquor Commission, based in Rankin Inlet, in 2005.
