= Ontario Deposit Return Program =

The Ontario Deposit Return Program (French: Programme de consignation de l'Ontario, ODRP), also simply known as Bag it Back, is a regulation of the province of Ontario, Canada. Its purpose is to divert recyclable materials from landfill or low-quality recycling uses by charging a fee for each alcoholic beverage container sold in the province, and processing the material for re-use or other recycling activities once the containers are returned for a refund of the deposit fee. Customers forfeit the deposit fee if the container is not returned.

The regulation took effect on 5 February 2007, and applies to manufacturers, wineries, and government stores licensed to sell alcohol under the Liquor Licence Act, but excludes the Brewers Retail Inc. packaging return system.

The concept had been debated before, and was proposed in a summary report of the Ministry of the Environment from a public consultation about the ministry's intention to divert 60% of waste from landfill to recycling and composting by 2008.

== Description ==
Under the program, a mandatory fee (deposit) is collected at the point of sale of alcoholic beverages, based on their containers, as follows:

- 10 cents for glass containers, polyethylene terephthalate (PET), Tetra Pak (polycoat) and Bag-in-a-Box of volumetric capacity up to 630 mL, and aluminum or steel cans less than or equal to 1 L.
- 20 cents for glass containers, polyethylene terephthalate, Tetra Pak and Bag-in-a-Box of volumetric capacity over 630 mL, and aluminum or steel cans over 1 L.

Exemptions to those include containers with a capacity of 100 mL or less, those purchased at U-Vint, U-Brew, and duty-free shops, and those purchased before 5 February 2007. Points of sale include all Liquor Control Board of Ontario (LCBO) retail outlets, LCBO Agency Stores and The Beer Store Retail Partners, and Ontario winery and distillery stores. Approximately "360 million containers are eligible for recycling through the Bag it Back program".

A refund for the deposit is made to the customer once the container is returned to The Beer Store, which manages the collection, processing and recycling of the containers on behalf of the province, or to an LCBO Agency store, an empty bottle dealer in rural communities, or a commercial return depot. The Beer Store signed a five-year contract with the Government of Ontario to manage the program at the program's inception, partly because "it already runs an efficient bottle-return program for beer bottles". For this, it receives 10 cents from the government per empty container collected. Its first year of operation was expected to cost the province $15 million, anticipating approximately 150 million containers would be returned. Previously, the province paid $5 million a year to Waste Diversion Ontario for glass reclamation from municipal Blue box programs. As part of the monitoring of this program, a mystery shopping company was contracted to visit 85% or more of the return locations on an annual basis. During each visit, a variety of empties were returned for refund to determine if the unit employees knew how to appropriately identify the container and provide the correct refund amount.

== Return rates and statistics ==
From 1 May 2008 to 30 April 2009, the program collected 259 million wine and spirit containers, approximately 73% of those sold by the LCBO and other retailers. The previous year, 67% of such containers were returned. About 84% of large containers (i.e. - those of capacity greater than 630 mL) were returned in that same period, an increase from the 77% of the previous year. Of that, about 145,000 tonnes of non-refillable glass was recycled by crushing it to cullet. Before the ODRP, about 33% of bottles, 50% of plastic and aluminum containers, and 75% of Tetra Paks purchased at the LCBO would ultimately be disposed to a landfill. At inception, the program was expected to divert up to 30,000 tonnes of glass and 120,000 tonnes of packaging from landfill. The objective was to "increase the overall recovery rate of LCBO packaging from about 65% to 85% while improving the recycling rate of what is collected from 30% to 85%", according to Usman Valiante. Before the ODRP was established, approximately 78,000 tonnes of glass was recycled via the blue box program, as well as restaurants and bars licensed to sell alcoholic beverages. About 68% of alcoholic beverage containers were collected by the blue box programs, representing seven percent of all recyclable waste, and the largest source of glass in that waste.

Such containers may also be placed in a Blue box or blue bin for curbside recycling, however the customer will not receive a refund for the deposit in this case; municipalities collect the deposit for bulk return of alcohol beverage containers to the Ontario Deposit Return Program. The ODRP claims that mixed, broken glass cannot be recycled into “high value” glass products but mixed broken glass is currently recycled into "high value" products including glass containers and fiberglass in Alberta and Quebec, Ontario was previously able to do so as well. The current fate of glass recycled from the ODRP, Ontario Waste Management, and Municipalities is not disclosed.

Scavenging to return for deposit glass and other material obtained from the blue boxes may be restricted by bylaws; the city of Toronto, for example, passed the Residential Collection By-Law 844-23-C to prohibit scavenging but the regulation is only rarely enforced and the practice remains prevalent throughout the downtown core.

Since the program's inception in 2007, to May 2017, three billion alcohol containers have been kept out of the province's landfills, instead being recycled through the Ontario Deposit Return Program, about 1.1 million tonnes of beverage alcohol containers have been diverted from landfill and 80% of all empties are returned to The Beer Store each year.

== Program promotion ==
The program was promoted via in-store advertising at the LCBO and its Agency Stores, at The Beer Store and its Retail Partners, and at Ontario wineries. Television, internet, and radio promotional campaigns were also created. The advertisements were designed by the LCBO, and the promotional campaign began on 15 January 2007.
