= Alliance Cinemas =

Canadian cinema chain

- Type: Subsidiary
- Industry: Film exhibitor
- Founded: August 14, 1998; 28 years ago
- Defunct: January 1, 2021; 5 years ago
- Headquarters: Toronto, Ontario, Canada
- Number of locations: 6 (at peak)
- Area served: Toronto, Ontario, Canada
- Parent: Alliance Atlantis (1998–2007); Cineplex Entertainment (2007–2021)

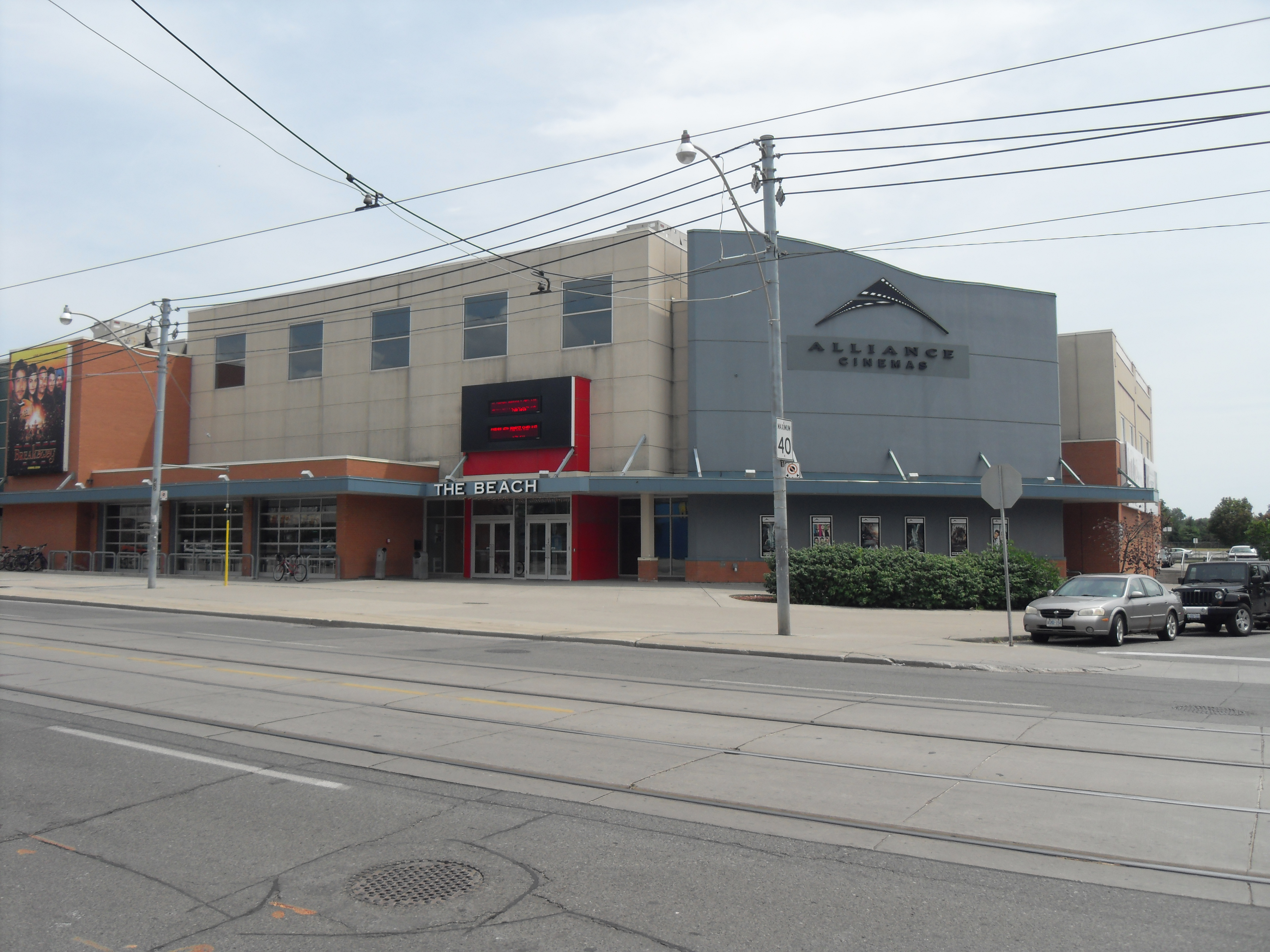
A picture of the Alliance Cinemas Beach Cinemas locations taken in 2011.

Alliance Cinemas (previously Alliance Atlantis Cinemas and Alliance Atlantis Beaches Cinemas, also known as Alliance Beach Cinemas) was a theatre chain, which operated 6 theatres at its peak. It is now owned by Cineplex Entertainment.

== History ==
In July 2005, following Cineplex's acquisition of main rival Famous Players Theatres, the group was put up for sale. In 2005, the Fifth Avenue Cinemas and the Park Theatre locations in Vancouver were sold to Festival Cinemas, which has since been sold to Cineplex Entertainment on March 1, 2013. Around 2006, the University 4 Cinemas location in Victoria was sold to Empire Theatres, which was later sold to Landmark Cinemas on October 31, 2013. Landmark Cinemas currently operates the theatre. In 2007, the Bayview Village Cinemas location in Toronto shut down, potentially due to a failure to reach a lease agreement. The Cumberland 4 Cinemas location in Yorkville, Toronto was shut down in May 2012. This left the company with only the Beaches Cinemas location.

On January 1, 2019, Alliance Cinemas was integrated with Cineplex brand of movie theatres, requiring patrons to purchase tickets on cineplex.com or in the theatre, and allowing patrons to utilize the Scene loyalty program. The remaining Beaches Cinemas was rebranded as Cineplex Cinemas Beaches and was later permanently closed in February 2026.
