= Alliance Atlantis =

Former Canadian film and media company

Alliance Atlantis Communications Inc.
- Type: Public
- Traded as: TSX: AAC; TSX: AAC.B; Nasdaq: AACB
- Predecessors: Alliance Entertainment Corporation; Atlantis Communications
- Founded: September 27, 1998; 28 years ago
- Founder: Michael MacMillan
- Defunct: June 23, 2008; 18 years ago (operations)
- Fate: Split up: Television catalogue sold to Goldman Sachs Alternatives, including co-rights to the CSI franchise; International operations sold to Echo Bridge Entertainment excluding international distribution rights to CSI, which were sold to CBS Paramount Television; Broadcasting assets sold to Canwest and Goldman Sachs Alternatives, continues to exist as Corus Media Holdings, Inc.; Film division (Motion Picture Distribution LP) sold to EdgeStone Capital Partners and Goldman Sachs Alternatives and rebranded as Alliance Films
- Successors: Corus Entertainment (television channels); Alliance Films and eOne Films (films); Echo Bridge Entertainment and Lionsgate Television (television catalogue); WildBrain, Studio 100 and Hasbro Entertainment (children’s catalogue); Cineplex Entertainment (movie theatres)
- Headquarters: 121 Bloor Street East, Toronto, Ontario, Canada
- Subsidiaries: Motion Picture Distribution LP (51%); Alliance Atlantis Cinemas (51%)
- Website: allianceatlantis.com (archived)

Alliance Atlantis Communications Inc. (commonly known as Alliance Atlantis) was a media company that operated primarily as a specialty service provider in Canada. Primarily based in Toronto, Alliance Atlantis also had offices in Halifax, Los Angeles, London, Dublin, Madrid, Barcelona, Shannon, and Sydney.

Alliance Atlantis was the result of a merger of two companies: Atlantis Communications, founded in 1978 by Michael MacMillan, Janice L. Platt and Seaton S. MacLean, and Alliance Communications, founded in 1984 by Stephen Roth, Denis Héroux, John Kemeny, Robert Lantos, Andras Hamori and Susan Cavan as Alliance Entertainment. Alliance Communications and Atlantis Communications merged to form Alliance Atlantis in 1998 which was a member of the North American Broadcasting Association (NABA).

The company ceased to exist in 2007 as the broadcasting division was acquired by Canwest Global Communications and an affiliate of Goldman Sachs that year. The motion picture division was then spun off and operated independently as Alliance Films, headquartered in Montreal (subsequently sold to Entertainment One and later, Lionsgate), and the international television distribution division was sold to Echo Bridge Entertainment.

All of the former Alliance Atlantis specialty networks, except for the now-defunct BBC Kids, are now owned by Corus Entertainment. The films division was later acquired by Entertainment One group and folded into eOne on January 9, 2013. Most of the assets of eOne, which included Alliance Atlantis' films division and television library, were later acquired by Lionsgate on December 27, 2023.

The Alliance name survived under the Alliance Cinemas banner until January 1, 2021; the theaters under the chain are now owned by Cineplex Entertainment.

== Formation and history ==
On July 20, 1998, Canadian production companies Alliance Communications and Atlantis Communications announced plans to merge their operations under a single company, Alliance Atlantis Communications Inc. The deal was fully closed on September 21. As President and Board Director of the subsequent combined Alliance Atlantis, Lewis Rose was responsible for leading the teams which arranged the merger financing of $545 million and which achieved in excess of $20 million in savings and synergies from the combination of the two companies in the year following the merger. (The merger was also parodied on Made in Canada, when that show's Pyramid Productions merged with a company called Prodigy.) After the merger, the company laid off 15% of their staff (much of them from pre-merger Alliance), and closed the former Atlantis sales office in Amsterdam. As part of the merger deal, Robert Lantos, founder of Alliance, signed a deal for film and TV production with Alliance Atlantis through his own firm, Serendipity Point Films.

At the time of the merger, both companies had launched various Canadian specialty television services; in 1995, Alliance launched Showcase Television while Atlantis launched Life Network (which has since been renamed "Slice"); in fall 1997 the companies launched History Television and HGTV Canada respectively. Earlier that year, Alliance Atlantis teamed up with Hallmark Cards to create Crayola Kids Adventures, a series of three direct-to-video adaptations of well-known children's novels. Atlantis had also been a major investor in YTV in its first few years before selling out to Shaw Communications and later, Corus Entertainment from 1999.

In 1998, the company purchased 75% of Cineplex Odeon Films. In 1999, German-based distributor Kinowelt took a 20% stake in the company alongside a 50% in their UK distribution arm Alliance Atlantis Releasing, which was renamed to Momentum Pictures in 2000. Also that year, the company secured the Canadian rights to distribute features by Destination Films. Also in 2000, it purchased the rights to CSI: Crime Scene Investigation from Disney's Touchstone Television. Another major deal in 2000 was a renewal of their distribution pact with Artisan Entertainment, including Canadian distribution of Artisan material, and UK theatrical distribution of Artisan films via Momentum Pictures.

The company expanded its business with its launch of its children's production label AAC Kids in 1999, and its nonfiction production label, AAC Fact in 2000. These labels were dissolved in 2003.

In April 2000, AAC Kids signed a European co-financing and distribution deal with German studio TV-Loonland AG. The distribution deal was valued at $14 million.

In July 2000, three months before Alliance Atlantis launched AAC Fact, Alliance Atlantis entered the documentary & nonfiction programming by acquiring independent producer and distributor Great North Communications for C$6 million. The acquisition of Great North had given Alliance Atlantis their own documentary and nonfiction production division.

In 2001, the company purchased Salter Street Films, which produced a number of television shows for both the Canadian and international market. However, soon after the acquisition, Salter Street was disbanded and its active projects were transferred to Alliance Atlantis' own television production/development division.

Citing lower profits, Alliance Atlantis later closed the majority of its production arm, aside from the highly profitable CSI: Crime Scene Investigation family of series, which it co-produces with CBS Television Studios. It briefly maintained Salter Street's long-running This Hour Has 22 Minutes before transferring the show to the Halifax Film Company, made up of former Salter Street employees. Its primary business became its ownership of a number of Canadian specialty services, which, in addition to those listed above, later included Food Network, Discovery Health (now FYI Canada), BBC Canada, BBC Kids and more.

Throughout the years, the company had purchased assets of several bankrupt studios, including Norstar Entertainment, Telescene, Peace Arch, Cinemavault, Odeon Films and in 2005, had bought out the television library of Fireworks Distributing Corporation from CanWest Global Communications.

In 2007, Alliance Atlantis was named one of Canada's Top 100 Employers, as published in Maclean's magazine, the only broadcaster to be included on the list.

== Sale to CanWest / Goldman Sachs ==
On December 20, 2006, the company announced that it was "exploring strategic alternatives", effectively putting the company up for sale. Expected bidders included Canwest Global, Corus Entertainment, Astral Media, and Rogers Communications. The rights to CSI were expected to be sold separately, with CBS Paramount Television as the most likely bidder. A similar announcement was made previously regarding the Motion Picture Distribution unit, which is also expected to be sold separately while finding a bidder to acquire most parts of the company.

On January 10, 2007, it was announced that Alliance Atlantis would be acquired by a consortium of Canwest Global and Goldman Sachs Alternatives.

- The Entertainment and Production division, consisting mainly of AAC's 50% stake in the lucrative CSI franchise, was acquired by Goldman Sachs Alternatives. CBS Paramount TV gained Alliance Atlantis' international distribution rights to the programs. These assets are now owned by Lionsgate Television as of 2024.
  - Alliance Atlantis' international television distribution operations were sold by Goldman Sachs Alternatives to Echo Bridge Entertainment.
- Motion Picture Distribution LP, including its publicly traded income fund, was acquired by Canada-based EdgeStone Capital Partners and Goldman Sachs Alternatives. On January 15, 2008, Edgemont's 51% voting stake (and 38.5% equity stake) in the Alliance label was purchased by Société générale de financement du Québec, an investment agency of the provincial government. Since the breakup, the company's films have been distributed under the "Alliance" banner for English-language releases and "Alliance Vivafilm" for French-language releases until the sale of the company to eOne.
- The Broadcasting division was jointly acquired by Canwest and Goldman Sachs Alternatives, with the former owning a majority voting interest and the latter a majority of the equity. Canwest owns 66.67% and GS owns 33.32% of CW Media, the holding company for the former AAC channels. Initially, Canwest still managed the channels it owned before the merger separately. It was expected that the Canwest and CW Media broadcasting divisions would eventually be merged, potentially also giving GS a sizable interest in Global and other Canwest channels (these plans became moot after Canwest's creditor protection filings).

=== Ramifications ===
Following Canwest seeking creditor protection in late 2009, Shaw Communications subsequently took over most of Alliance Atlantis's former broadcasting assets as of October 27, 2010. after CRTC approval for the sale was announced on October 22. Alliance Atlantis (CW Media) became part of the Shaw Media division. Corus Entertainment acquired Shaw Media on April 1, 2016.

Entertainment One would later acquire Alliance Films on January 9, 2013, and all of their subsidiaries from Goldman Sachs, similar to the purchase of Maple Pictures a year prior. eOne subsequently adopted the 2004 Alliance Atlantis fanfare, still in use by Alliance Films, for their own logo. On November 20, 2014, Echo Bridge Entertainment sold Alliance Atlantis' children's programs, including the international distribution rights to the Degrassi franchise, to DHX Media. In 2017, producer Steven Paul announced that he would acquire the non-family assets of Echo Bridge Entertainment, including the international distribution rights to Alliance Atlantis' library (with the exception of its children's programs that are still owned by DHX Media/WildBrain) and later folded it into SP Releasing, in turn licensed most of Alliance Atlantis, Cineplex Odeon Films, Echo Bridge and PM Entertainment libraries to FilmRise for digital distribution and online streaming. eOne in turn was acquired by U.S. toy maker Hasbro in 2019. On August 3, 2023, Hasbro announced that it would sell most of eOne's assets, including the copyrights and Canadian distribution rights to the library of Alliance Atlantis, to Lionsgate (which Hasbro attempted to acquire in 2017). The deal closed on December 27, 2023.

== Assets ==
=== Broadcasting ===
Channels marked in bold lettering indicates Alliance Atlantis was the managing partner.

Specialty channels

- BBC Canada (80%) (now defunct)
- BBC Kids (80%) (now defunct)
- Discovery Health Canada (80%) (Later FYI Canada, now defunct)
- Fine Living Canada (80.24%) (later replaced by DIY Network Canada and Magnolia Network - replaced by the Rogers version in 2025)
- Food Network Canada (57.58%, now Flavour Network)
- HGTV Canada (80.24%, now Home Network)
- History Television (now History Canada)
- IFC Canada (now defunct)
- National Geographic Channel Canada (80%)
- Showcase
- Showcase Action (now Action, later replaced by Adult Swim)
- Showcase Diva (now Lifetime Canada)
- Slice
- Historia (50%) with Astral Media.
- One (37.77%) (now owned by ZoomerMedia)
- SCREAM (49%) (now defunct; last known as Dusk, later became ABC Spark) with Corus Entertainment owning the other stake
- Séries+ (50%) with Astral Media owning the other stake
- Score Media Inc. (25.93%)
  - HARDtv (now Playmen TV)
  - OutTV
  - The Score (now Sportsnet 360)

Websites

- BlogTV (Now defunct, merged with YouNow)

Proposed but never launched

- Adventure One (devoted entirely to documentary and human-interest programming that pushes the boundaries of exploration and adventure. It will not only celebrate adventure but also use the excitement of adventure programming as a vehicle to explore and explain the deeper issues of conservation and earth and cultural sustainability that underline the important work and mission of the National Geographic Society)
- Aviation TV (dedicated to all aspects of flight and aviation including airplanes and flyers)
- The Canadian Consumer Channel (dedicated to providing Canadians with timely, useful information about the goods and services they consume on a daily basis. The service will present unbiased buying advice on major products in all categories (from toys to household appliances); ratings on brands in all categories; information on product repair history and recalls as well as environmental concerns; and, in-depth investigative reports on financial services, employment services, travel packages and other services of keen interest to Canadian consumers)
- Canal Aventure (devoted exclusively to documentaries on exploration and adventure)
- Canal National Geographic (devoted to documentaries on geography, cultures of the world, anthropology, explorations of far-away places, nature conservation, and geopolitics)
- Classics TV (devoted to the timeless classic popular television and film programming from Canada and around the world. The classics from the silver screen and Hollywood's golden age will also be presented. The service will also broadcast any popular television programming from the past)
- Comedy for Kids (dedicated exclusively to comedy programming targeting children aged 5 to 17 years and their families)
- Corporate TV (devoted to corporate news and information about companies operating in Canada and around the world, including live and taped coverage of corporate meetings, press conferences and other corporate events as well as general corporate information)
- Cottage Life (entirely devoted to information and lifestyle programming about cottage communities; cottage activities such as boating, swimming, fishing, golfing, water sports and indoor games; information about buying, selling and renovating cottage properties; programs of special interest to the cottage owner dealing with such matters as shoreline, docks, decks, boathouses, water supply, wood stoves; cottage cooking and recipes; and the history of cottaging) eventually launched in 2013
- DIY Television (designed for the do-it-yourselfer of all levels. The service will be entirely devoted to programs that offer Canadians an interactive television experience that provides immediate access to detailed step by step instructions, in-depth demonstrations, and tips for do-it-yourself projects)
- Girls TV (dedicated to serving the entertainment and information needs of young female television viewers, aged 5 to 17 years, with a special emphasis on programs that embody a sense of confidence, empowerment and positive self-image)
- Jobs TV (dedicated to providing employers, job seekers and Canadians interested in the latest employment opportunities with information relating to the work world, employment, and trends in the workforce)
- Justice TV (dedicated to documentaries, movies and drama series related to law and order. The programming will consist of programs about police forces, the justice system, lawyers and law firms. The service will also feature magazine-style programs focusing on the criminal justice system in Canada, great crimes and trials, and ethical issues facing judges and citizens today)
- The Luxe Network (dedicated to programming about the finer things in life. This service will feature all things that can bring a taste of the luxurious into our lives, from vacations and leisure activities to home furnishings and fashion. The Luxe Network will become the ultimate source of information and entertainment about the best quality products and services in Canada and around the world. The service will schedule documentaries, magazine-style and human interest programs)
- Magazine Rack Television (devoted to programs based primarily on Canadian magazines. Each program will adapt the brand and content of a magazine to television. Programming will resemble a magazine display with Canadian magazines at its forefront and other magazines on its shelves)
- Martial Arts TV (dedicated to the martial arts and martial arts programs, including programs from around the world showcasing the various styles of martial arts such as kung fu, karate, judo, tae kwan do, kendo, jujitsu, and aikido. The licensee will also provide programming dealing with martial arts philosophies and leaders)
- Military Television (featuring programs related to the history, analysis and dramatization of armed conflict and military matters, peacekeeping, and warfare throughout the world. Programming will consist of series, feature films, drama, documentaries and information as well as analysis and magazine style programs)
- Nature TV (offering programming focusing on the entertaining and informative aspects of nature and wildlife and featuring plants, animals, marine life, geography and people who explore the natural world)
- Nostalgia TV (entirely dedicated to classic television series, sitcoms and feature films. The service will also include occasional magazine style shows focusing on this genre)
- Ocean Life TV (devoted to information and entertainment with the theme of water and life in, on and around oceans, including television series with water themes, underwater adventures and exploration, water and beach sports, and tours of ocean and oceanfront locations)
- Play TV (devoted to programming featuring games, game shows and the way people play)
- Real TV (entirely devoted to telling real-life stories about people. Reality-based programs ranging from high-drama stunt action to amateur home videos and programs that capture the emotions and magic of some of life's most intimate moments, will give viewers a firsthand look at the real life experiences of others)
- Recovery TV (devoted to real-life stories of those who have overcome addiction, destructive behaviour, and poor lifestyle decisions. Programming will celebrate these survivors for their triumphs and provide hope for those who are in need of help)
- Relationships TV (devoted to information and entertainment about intimate human relationships featuring sexuality, dating, marriage, divorce, friendships, parenting and families)
- Scream TV (dedicated to the horror genre. Primarily a movie channel, Scream TV will also develop original horror series and magazines shows that explore the horror phenomenon)
- Skating TV (dedicated to the sport and art of skating which will focus principally on the sport and art of amateur and professional figure skating. Programming will include live and taped skating events, skating shows and movies, features of great skaters, performances from the past, and ongoing analysis of the skating world)
- The Collectors Network (devoted to thematic programming focusing exclusively on the world of collecting, collections, and auctions, and the preservation and exhibition of collections)
- The World Cinema Channel (dedicated to exploring and showcasing the best of contemporary foreign films and classics. The service will also provide film criticism and commentary on international cinema and international film festivals)
- Trains, Boats and Planes (dedicated to programming related to railroads and railroading; pleasure boats, shipping, cruises, cruise lines and nautical history, aircraft, flying and aviation. The service will schedule documentaries, feature films and series as well as occasional magazine-style shows focusing on this genre)
- TV Guide Channel (devoted exclusively to programs that inform and entertain viewers about the world of television. Through show reviews, highlights, interviews and discussions, viewers will be able to make informed decisions about the television programs they want to watch)
- U8TV (providing information and lifestyle programming and real-life drama on the Internet, based on following the lives of 8 real people living in a loft. It will provide regularly scheduled lifestyle, entertainment and real-life drama programming hosted by the lofters while at the same time, providing the television viewer with the opportunity to follow the daily lives of the lofters)
- Wheels (dedicated to all aspects of cars and other wheeled vehicles such as motorcycles and trucks, including ownership, racing, repairs and culture)
- Wheels Channel (dedicated to cars, their manufacture, driving and automotive history. The service will schedule documentaries, feature films and drama series as well as magazine style shows focusing on this subject)
- World News TV (dedicated to news from world sources and programming providing commentary and analysis on world news. The licensee shall compile news from non-Canadian sources, from a non-Canadian perspective, and will offer some programming in languages other English, with English subtitles. Canadian programming shall consist of analysis on world news stories as they are reported by non-Canadian news organizations)
- X-Treme TV (dedicated entirely to programming about world records being set and being broken and other human achievements. Programming will include lifestyle, documentary and drama programs that showcase the incredible and the bizarre and explores the human spirit)
- ZTV (targeted to Generation-Y, young adults between the ages of 18 and 29. Programming shall focus on innovative technologies and new media, youth/extreme sports, sex, jobs, education, music, leisure activities and current events)

=== Cinemas ===
Alliance Atlantis owned a chain of cinemas called Alliance Cinemas. The chain owned movie theatres in British Columbia and Ontario and was based in Toronto.

=== Entertainment ===
This division of Alliance Atlantis developed and distributed various television programmes to Canadian, American and International broadcasters. The programs ranged from series, lifestyle and documentaries. Some documentaries were produced through the AAC Fact unit.

=== AAC Kids ===
In April 2008, Echo Bridge Home Entertainment acquired the television catalogue of Alliance Atlantis. In November 2014, DHX Media (which changed its name to WildBrain in 2019) acquired a majority of Echo Bridge's children's catalogue.

In 2011, the German distributor m4e AG acquired the catalogue of TV-Loonland AG, AAC Kids' European distributor. In 2017, the Belgian distributor Studio 100 acquired a majority stake in m4e AG.

- The Olden Days Coat (1981)
- A Child's Christmas in Wales (1987)
- Ramona (1988–1989)
- Double Daniel (1989)
- Max Glick (1990)
- The Adventures of the Black Stallion (1990–1992)
- Maniac Mansion (1990–1993)
- The Cutaway (1991)
- Kelly (1991)
- That Scatterbrain Booky (1992)
- Wild Side Show (1992–1993)
- The Odyssey (1992–1995)
- White Fang (1993–1994)
- The Mighty Jungle (1994)
- Squawk Box (1994)
- ReBoot (1994–2001)
- Mirror, Mirror (1995)
- Flash Forward (1995–1997)
- Straight Up (1996–1998)
- Beast Wars: Transformers (1996–1999)
- My Life as a Dog (1997)
- Crayola Kids Adventures (1997) (co-production with Hallmark Studios)
- Captain Star (1997–1998)
- Mirror, Mirror II (1997–1998)
- Mowgli: The New Adventures of the Jungle Book (1998)
- Legacy (1998–1999)
- The Famous Jett Jackson (1998–2001)
- Shadow Raiders (1998–1999)
- Pumper Pups (1999)
- I Was a Sixth Grade Alien (1999–2001)
- Hoze Houndz (1999–2002)
- Yvon of the Yukon (2000–2002)
- In a Heartbeat (2000–2001)
- A Fish Tale (2000)
- Oscar Charlie (2001)
- Sail Away (2001–2007)
- Old Tom (2001–2002)
- Degrassi: The Next Generation (2001–2007)
- Ace Lightning (2002–2004)
- Connie the Cow (2003–2007)
- Henry's World (2002–2005)
- Mental Block (2004–2006)
- Poko (2003–2006)
- Dragon Booster (2004–2006)
- Instant Star (2004–2007)
- Lunar Jim (2006–2011)

=== Comedy and drama programs ===
- Airwaves (1985)
- The Ray Bradbury Theater (1985–1992)
- Mount Royal (1987)
- Bordertown (1989–1991)
- E.N.G. (1989–1994)
- Mom P.I. (1990–1991)
- Neon Rider (1990–1995)
- Counterstrike (1991–1993)
- African Skies (1991–1994)
- Destiny Ridge (1993–1994)
- This Hour Has 22 Minutes (1993–present) (Produced by Salter Street Films until 2003, now owned and produced by WildBrain)
- Due South (1994–1999)
- TekWar (1994–1995) (American rights owned by Universal Television)
- Mysterious Island (1995)
- The Outer Limits (1995–2002)
- Adventures of Sinbad (1996–1997)
- Traders (1996–2000)
- Psi Factor: Chronicles of the Paranormal (1996–2000)
- Fast Track (1997–1998)
- Night Man (1997–1999)
- Earth: Final Conflict (1997–2002)
- Cold Squad (1998–2005)
- Welcome to Paradox (1998)
- The Crow: Stairway to Heaven (1998–1999) (American rights owned by Universal Television)
- Da Vinci's Inquest (1998–2005)
- Power Play (1998–2000)
- Little Men (1998–1999)
- Nothing Too Good for a Cowboy (1998–2000)
- Total Recall 2070 (1999) (American rights owned by Universal Television)
- Peter Benchley's Amazon (1999–2000)
- BeastMaster (1999–2002)
- Drop the Beat (2000–2001)
- Starhunter (2000–2004)
- 2gether: The Series (2000)
- CSI: Crime Scene Investigation (2000–2015) (Now owned by CBS Studios)
- Trailer Park Boys (2001–present) (Distribution rights to TV and DVD, now distributed by Lionsgate Television worldwide)
- Haven (2001)
- The Associates (2001–2002)
- CSI: Miami (2002–2012) (Now owned by CBS Studios)
- The Eleventh Hour (2002–2005)
- CSI: NY (2004–2013) (Now owned by CBS Studios)
- Rent-a-Goalie (2006–2008)

=== AAC Fact ===
- Turning Points of History (1997–2004)
- Gladiatrix (2001)
- Daredevils (2001, co-production with GRB Entertainment)

==== Feature films ====
- Overdrawn at the Memory Bank (1984)
- Iron Eagle II (1986)
- The Wraith (1986)
- The Gate (1987)
- The Gate II: Trespassers (1990)
- Black Robe (1991)
- The Twist (1992)
- I Love a Man in Uniform (1993)
- Paris, France (1993)
- Exotica (1994)
- Johnny Mnemonic (1995)
- When Night Is Falling (1995)
- National Lampoon's Senior Trip (1995)
- Never Talk to Strangers (1995)
- Family of Cops (1995)
- Crash (1996)
- The Sweet Hereafter (1997)
- In the Company of Men (1997)
- Last Night (1998)
- Air Bud: Golden Receiver (1998)
- Existenz (1999)
- The Five Senses (1999)
- A Room for Romeo Brass (1999)
- Jesus' Son (1999)
- Something More (1999)
- Sunshine (1999)
- Felicia's Journey (1999)
- Stardom (2000)
- Relative Values (2000)
- The Claim (2000)
- The 51st State (2001)
- Slackers (2002)
- Virginia's Run (2002)
- Men with Brooms (2002)
- Bowling for Columbine (2002)
- Morvern Callar (2002)
- Ararat (2002)
- Alice's Odyssey (2002)
- The Good Thief (2002)
- Max (2002)
- Steal (2002)
- Owning Mahowny (2003)
- Blizzard (2003)
- Kart Racer (2003)
- The Barbarian Invasions (2003)
- Game Over: Kasparov and the Machine (2003)
- Foolproof (2003)
- My Life Without Me (2003)
- The Blue Butterfly (2004)
- Going the Distance (2004)
- Saint Ralph (2004)
- The Rocket (2005)
- Munich (2005) (Credit only, produced by Universal Pictures and DreamWorks Pictures)
- Angel's Rage (2006)
- Bon Cop, Bad Cop (2006)
- Snow Cake (2006)
- Trailer Park Boys: The Movie (2006)
- It's a Boy Girl Thing (2006)
- Days of Darkness (2007)
- The Stone Angel (2007)

==== Short films ====
- Boys and Girls (1983)

== Alliance Films ==
Alliance Films was a major motion picture distribution/production company which serves Canada, the United Kingdom, and Spain. Formally known as Motion Picture Distribution LP, it was re branded and relaunched in 2007 due to the break-up of its preceding company, Alliance Atlantis, which was sold off piece by piece to Canwest Global, Goldman Sachs Alternatives, along with several other smaller companies. Alliance Atlantis and Vivafilm home video releases were manufactured and distributed by NBCUniversal's Universal Pictures Home Entertainment.

Entertainment One (eOne) later acquired Alliance Films on January 9, 2013, for $225 million and merged Alliance Films and all of their subsidiaries under the latter brand. Most of the assets of eOne, as well as Alliance Films libraries was subsequently bought by Lionsgate in late 2023.
