= BC Cannabis Stores =

Canadian cannabis retailer

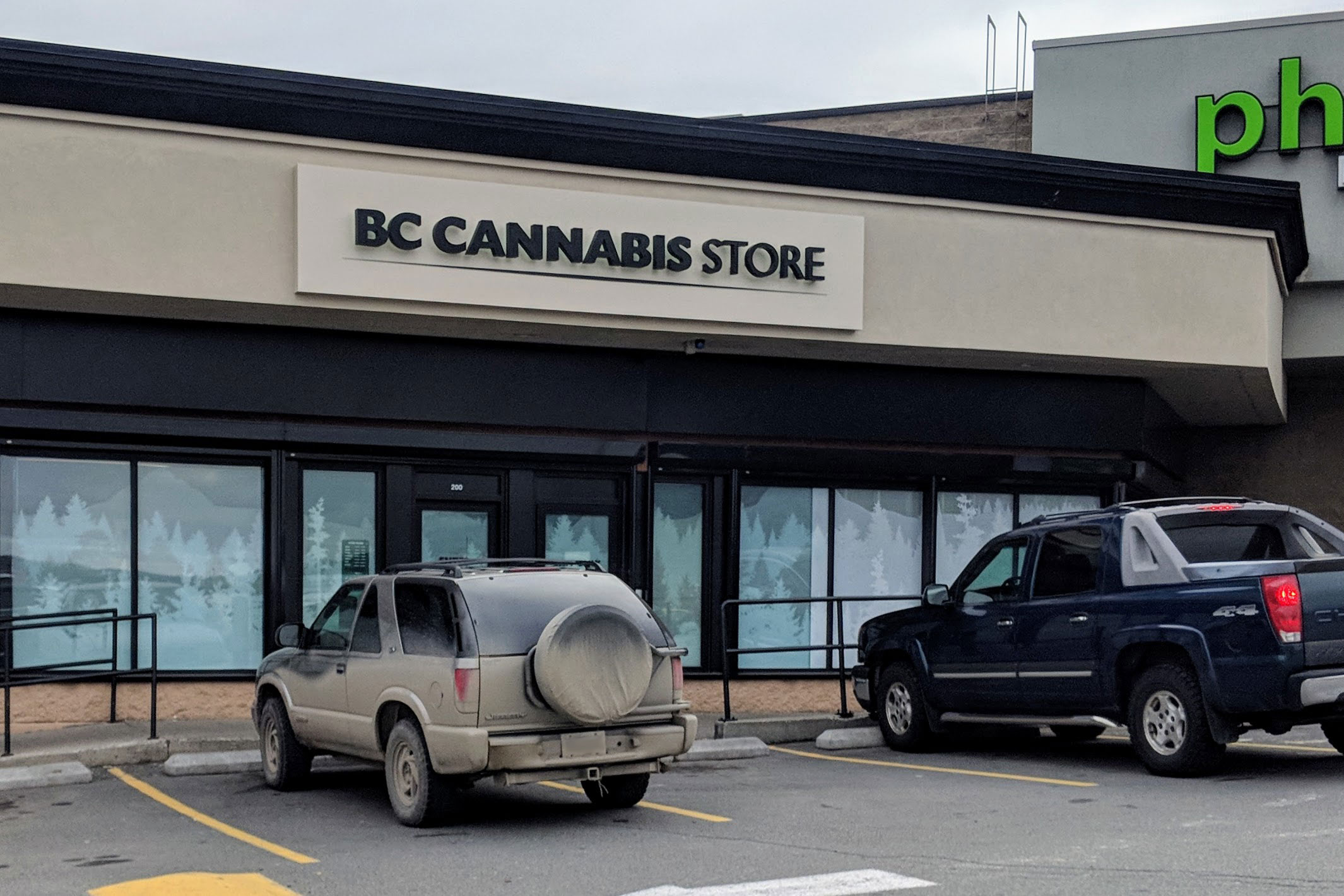
- BC Cannabis Store in Kamloops
- Industry: Retail
- Founded: October 17, 2018; 7 years ago
- Headquarters: Vancouver, British Columbia, Canada
- Number of locations: 39
- Products: Cannabis sales and distribution (permitted by law)
- Website: www.bccannabisstores.com

BC Cannabis Stores are a chain of outlets operated by the British Columbia Liquor Distribution Branch (BCLDB) to distribute cannabis products provincial-wide in British Columbia, Canada. BC Cannabis Stores operates both in-store and online, unlike BC Liquor Stores. BC Cannabis currently operates 39 stores across BC.

== History ==
BC Cannabis Stores (BCCS) was established on October 17, 2018 following the Cannabis Act, which legalized the use of recreational cannabis in Canada. The Lower Mainland began opening locations in 2020. Most recent BC Cannabis Stores include Burnaby in 2022, with Delta and Langley opening in 2023.
