= Sailing Away =

Sailing Away may refer to:

- "Sailing Away" (All of Us song)
- "Sailing Away", a song by Chris de Burgh from Flying Colours

== See also ==
- Sail Away (disambiguation)
- Come Sail Away
