= Park Theatre (Vancouver) =

Cinema in Vancouver, Canada

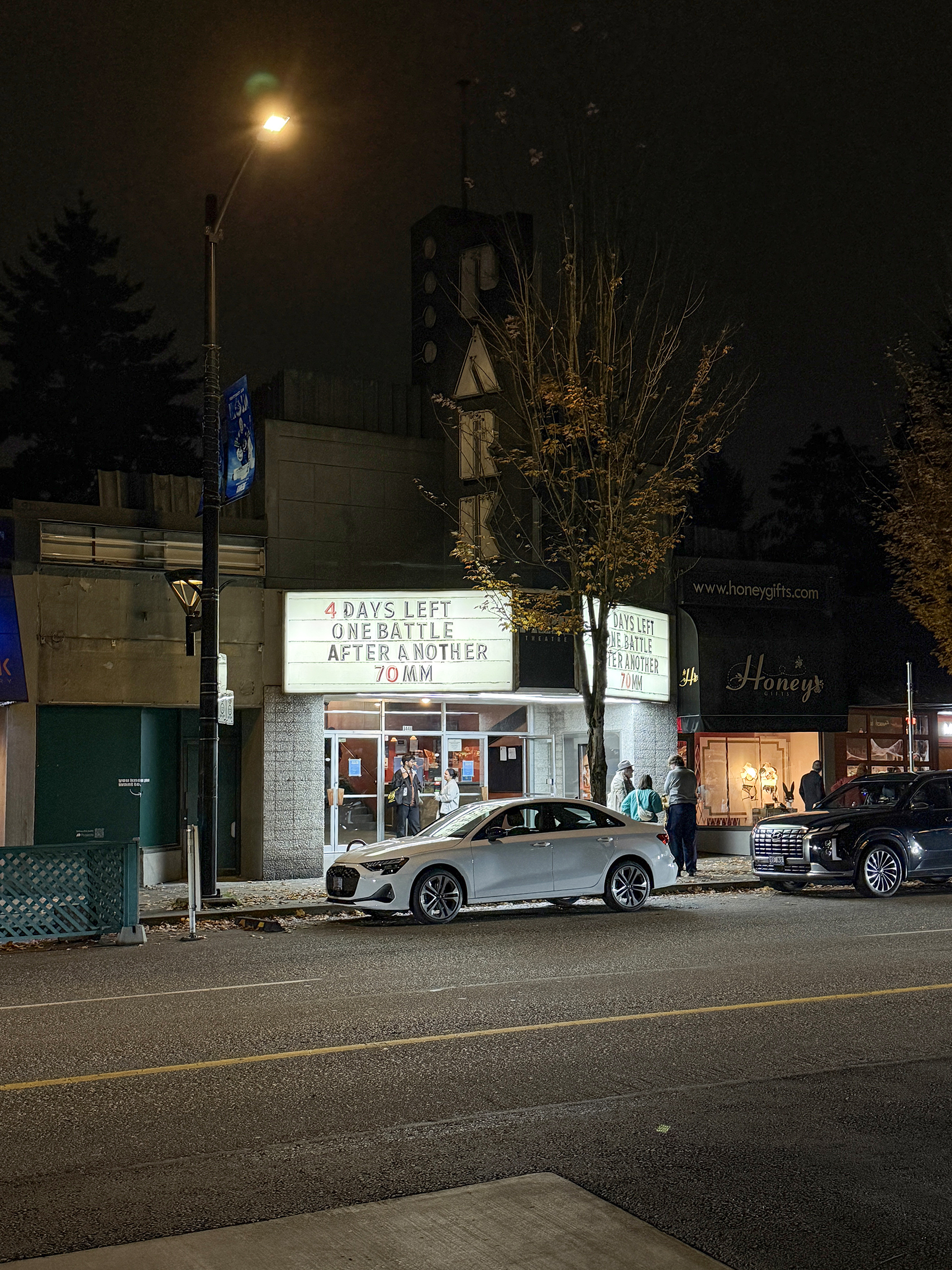
- Exterior of the theatre in 2025
- Interactive map of Park Theatre
- Location: 3440 Cambie Street; Vancouver, British Columbia; V5Z 2W8
- Coordinates: 49.25448°N 123.11494°W
- Owner: Various investors (formerly, Odeon Theatres, Cineplex Odeon, Famous Players Festival Cinemas and Cineplex Entertainment)
- Operator: Corinne Lea
- Capacity: 504
- Type: Movie theatre

Construction
- Groundbreaking: 1940
- Built: 1940-1941
- Opened: August 4, 1941
- Renovated: 2005

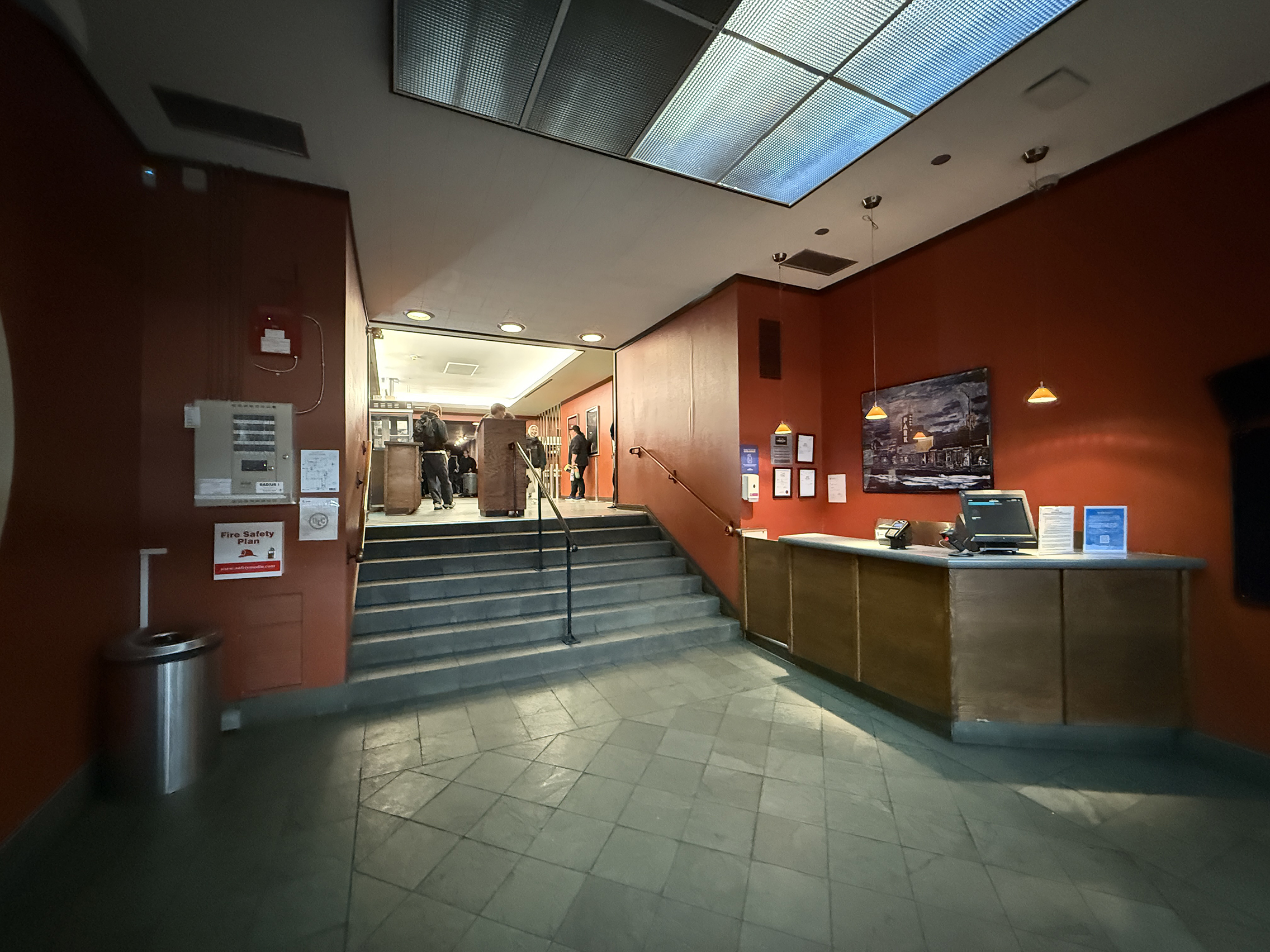
Ticket booth

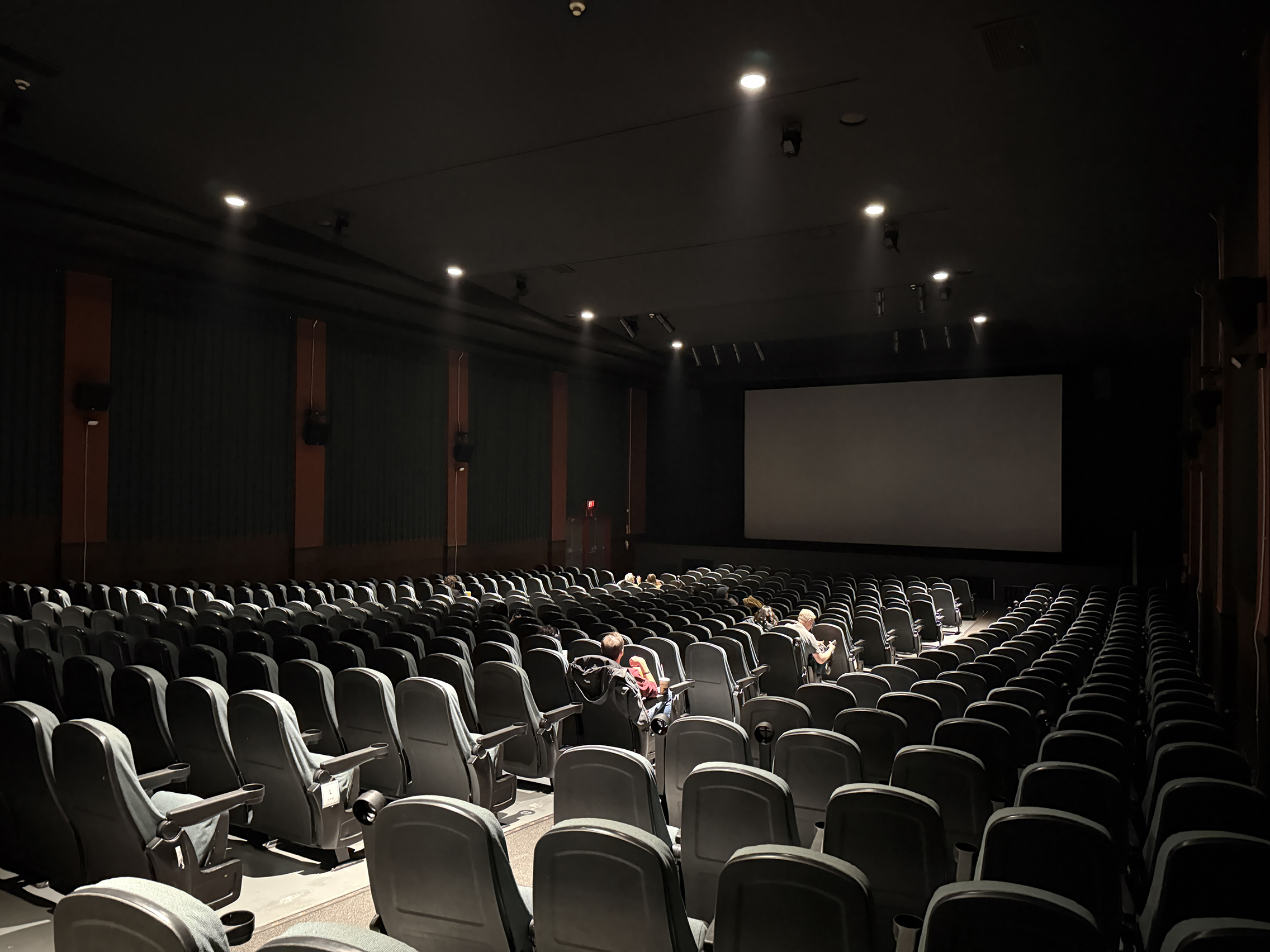
Theatre inside

The Park Theatre is an independent neighbourhood movie house on Cambie Street in Vancouver, British Columbia, built in the Art Deco style. Opened in 1941, it has passed through several owners, including Odeon Theatres, Famous Players and Alliance Atlantis Cinemas, and in 2005 was renovated and became part of the Festival Cinemas chain then Cineplex Entertainment in 2013.

In late October 2025, following an announcement by owner Cineplex that the theatre would be shuttered that month, it was acquired by a group of investors tied to the Rio Theatre who reopened the venue in December.

== History ==
The Park was built in 1940 by the architectural firm Kaplan & Sprachman, who designed over 300 cinemas between the 1920s and 1960s, including the Vogue Theatre in Vancouver and the Uptown in Toronto. The Park opened on August 4, 1941 with a showing of Model Wife. It was originally run by Odeon Theatres.

In 1984, Odeon Theatres became Cineplex Odeon Corporation, and in 1990, Cineplex Odeon decided not to renew the Park's lease. The theatre was taken over by Leonard Schein's Festival Cinemas, which at various times also has run the Ridge, the Plaza, the Varsity, the Starlight, the Vancouver East and Fifth Avenue Cinemas. Schein had previously founded the Vancouver International Film Festival (VIFF) in 1982.

Alliance Atlantis bought Schein's company in 1998, and he remained in management there until 2001, when he decided to retire from the movie-theatre business. The Park was run by a partnership of Alliance and Famous Players for a few years, but they decided not to renew its lease in 2005. Schein, who was by then involving himself in projects such as the Canadian Cancer Society, Friends of Larry Campbell and Doctors Without Borders, had not been planning to get back into the movie business. However, phone calls from the building's landlord and local business owners and residents convinced him to lease the theatre and reopen it.

Leonard Schein renovated a gutted Park Theatre in 2005, at a cost of over $300,000. Famous Players had taken everything from the building except a toilet and sink, and since Schein was left with a shell, and had to compete with other theatres, he decided to make the cinema as inviting as possible. Vancouver architect Elizabeth MacKenzie redesigned the interior of the building, and Brad Busby coordinated the construction work, which was done by sub-contractors. New seats were added (down to 504 from 640), with seat rows staggered to allow audiences to have a good view of the new 5.5-by-11.0-metre (18 ft × 36 ft) screen. A Dolby Digital sound system was installed, as were new flooring and lights. The exterior has mostly been kept the same to preserve the historical element of the cinema. The Park Theatre alongside the Fifth Avenue Theatre was acquired by Cineplex Entertainment in 2013 after the Festival chain permanently ceased operations.

In August 2025, Rio Theatre owner and CEO Corrine Lea was approached by a representative of the venue's landlord, regarding acquiring the lease when Cineplex's expired. Lea enlisted local filmmaker Chris Ferguson to rally investors. On October 22, 2025, Cineplex announced the imminent closure of the Park Theatre after the company’s lease on the building expired. Five days later, it was announced that Lea would partner with a group of investors in operating the venue, including Chris Ferguson, Osgood Perkins, Mike Flanagan, Sean Baker, Samantha Quan, Zach Lipovsky, Finn Wolfhard, film editor Graham Fortin, sound designer Eugenio Battaglia, post supervisor Andy Levine, film coordinator Jill Orsten, and attorney Christina Bulbrook, aiming to operate the Park as an independent neighborhood movie theater, with a new operations team, led by Lea. The new ownership group made significant renovations to the Park, including a new Cinemeccanica 70 mm projector to replace the old one, which Cineplex retained. In addition, the new owners repainted the lobby, repaired the neon entrance sign, installed a new Christie zero-gain screen, and introduced 7.1 surround sound to the theatre. Rachel Fox is in charge of programming the Park Theatre, which aims to attract a much broader audience than the Cinematheque.
