= Rio Theatre =

Art house in Vancouver, Canada

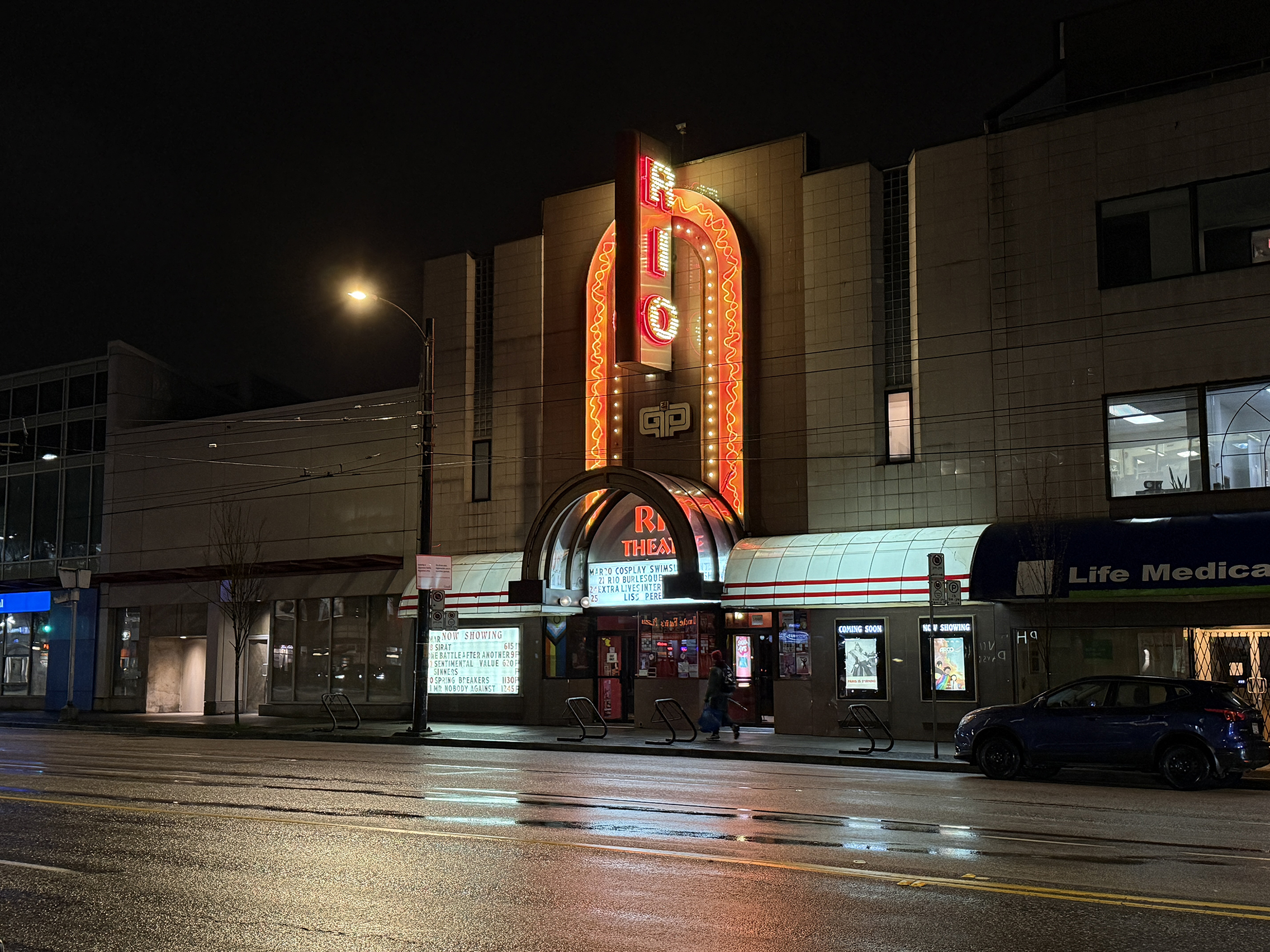
- Rio Theatre at night in 2026
- Interactive map of Rio Theatre
- Address: 1660 East Broadway; Vancouver; Canada
- Coordinates: 49.262095°N 123.070477°W
- Owner: Corinne Lea
- Capacity: 409 seats; 582 with standing room
- Type: Live Venue and Movie Theatre

Construction
- Built: 1938
- Renovated: 2006
- Architect: Max Breeze Downing

Website
- riotheatre.ca

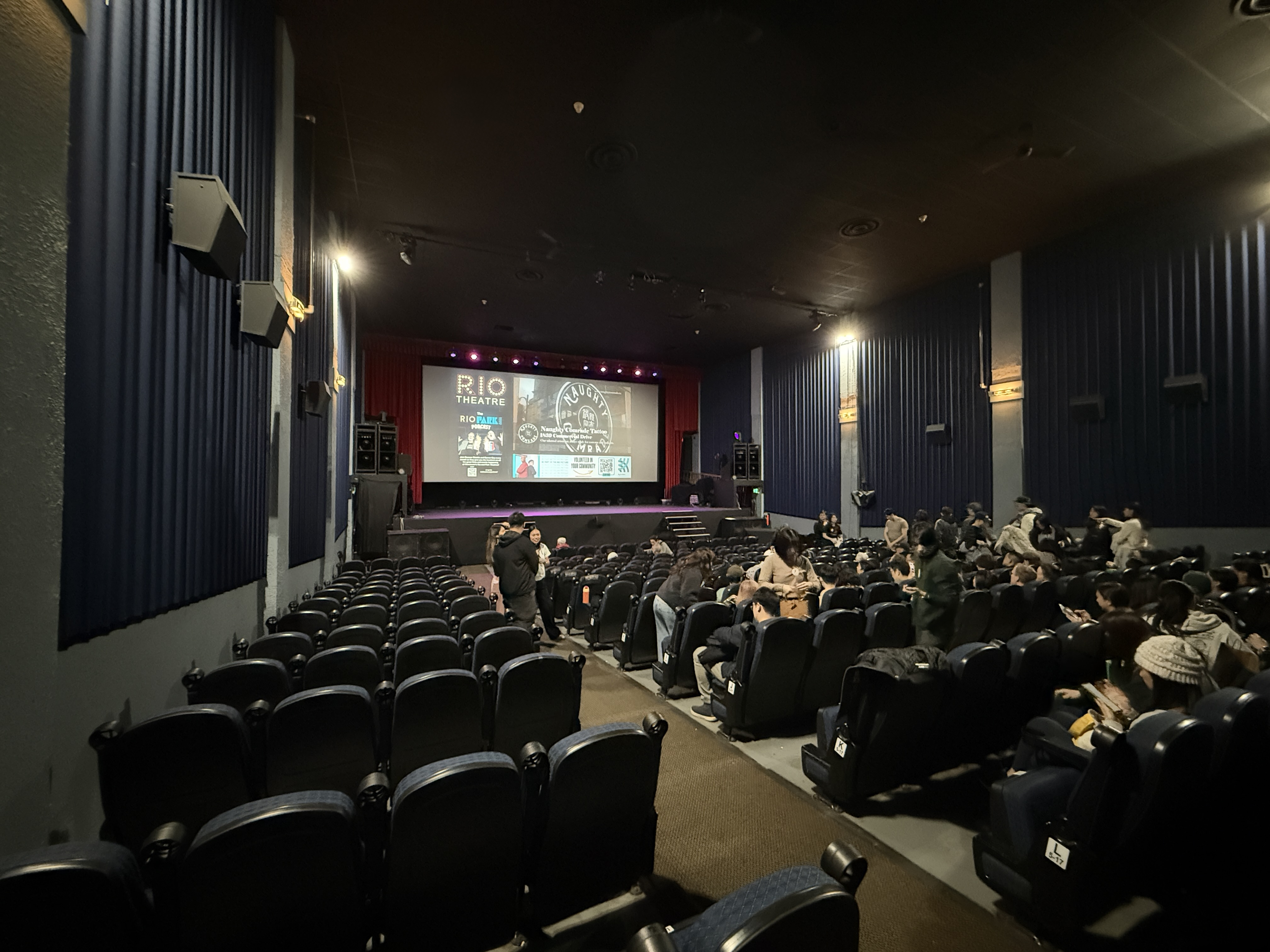
Rio Theatre interior, 2026

The Rio Theatre is an independent, multidisciplinary art house in Vancouver, British Columbia, Canada. Built in 1938, the Rio served East Vancouver primarily as a movie theatre until 2008, when new owner, Corinne Lea, began to add live music and multimedia and multidisciplinary art events. The Rio has since become a well known cultural hub in East Vancouver, famous for launching several successful public battles to save the theatre.

The Rio seats 409 people, including a balcony section. The projection room houses a NEC NC2000C digital projector that was installed in 2010. The venue includes a lobby with concession voted best in 2010 and 2011 for single-screen theatres in Vancouver, a large stage, and a backstage greenroom for live performers.

Since its evolution in 2008, the Rio has hosted Hollywood blockbusters, local independent filmmakers, midnight screenings of cult classics, the toddler-friendly "Movies for Mommies" series, local and international film festivals, comedy festivals, queer film events, burlesque shows, screenings and tours for local public schools, political events, religious services, spoken word and other live performances, and local and international live music.

The Dear Rouge song "Meet Me At The Rio" is about the venue.

== History ==
Originally opened in 1938, the Rio Theatre was hailed as "ultra modern", "designed for perfection in sight and sound", and "Vancouver's Finest Suburban Theatre". The double bill on opening day featured James Cagney and Marjorie Daw in Something to Sing About and Ann Dvorak in She's No Lady, with tickets sold for 25 cents.

Designed by Henry Alwyn Calladine, the theatre was "fireproof from foundation to roof... designed for comfort with special attention to perfection of enjoyment of pictures through sight and sound". The initial seating layout had 800 seats, with the first rows angled upwards to provide better view of the screen. The original seats were "duplicates of chairs used by King George and Queen Elizabeth" and manufactured by LaSalle Recreations Ltd.

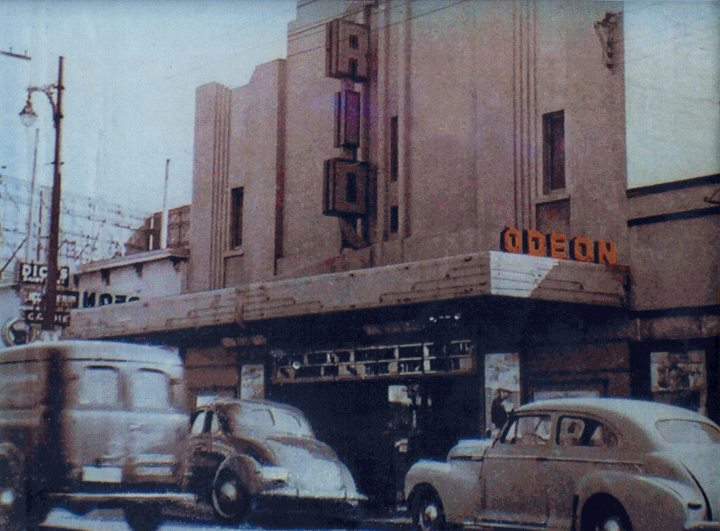
Photo of the Rio Theatre as part of the Odeon chain in the 1940s

The theatre became part of the Odeon chain of single-screen cinemas across Canada until 1955, when the rise of television closed the Rio Theatre, along with several other theatres across the city. From 1959 to 1976, the Rio became the Rio Bowl – a bowling alley operated by Grandview Recreations. It then returned to its original form as a movie theatre in 1982, this time as the Golden Princess Theatre, showcasing Chinese films. In 2001, the theatre changed hands again, becoming Broadway Cinema.

== Dispute with British Columbia Liquor Control and Licensing Branch ==
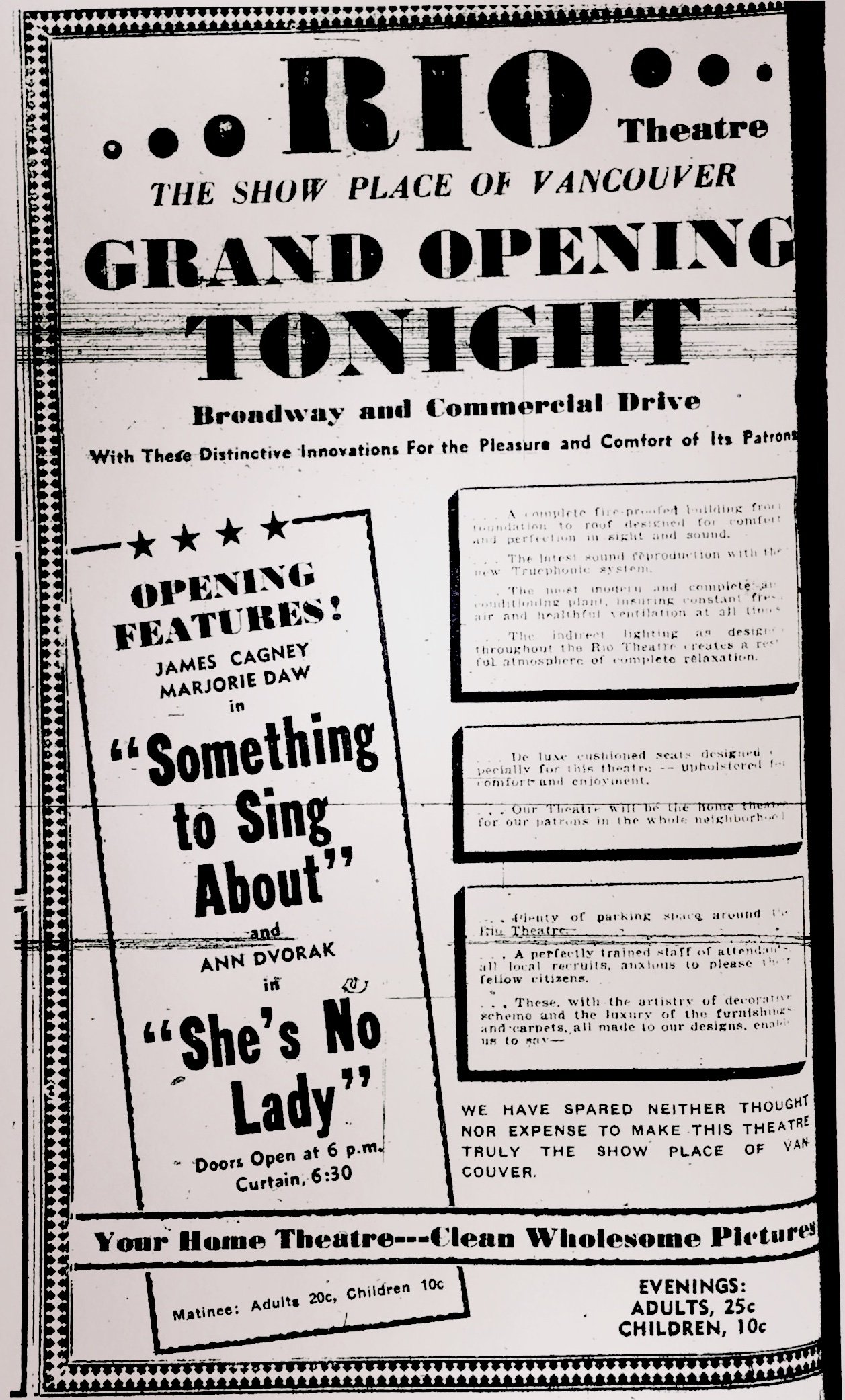
Advertisement in the Vancouver New Herald on April 7, 1938, about the grand opening of the Rio Theatre and screenings of Something to Sing About and She's No Lady

According to owner Corinne Lea, the Rio was at risk of business failure under a movies-only model, as indicated by the failure of all but two single-screen theatres in Vancouver by the end of 2011. In 2010, Lea applied for a primary liquor license from the British Columbia Liquor Control and Licensing Branch, in order to attract more live music events where alcohol could be served. When the license was presented to Lea on January 18, 2012, the LCLB had inserted a condition, unique among any primary liquor license holder in the province, that "This establishment is not permitted to show movies or any type of cinematic screenings at any time", effectively banning the Rio from screening films at any point in the future, regardless of whether alcohol is being served. Lea has said she felt she had no choice but to sign the license or the Rio would need to shut its doors.

Response to the LCLB decision ranged from a Facebook-centred community political action campaign, targeting the LCLB and provincial MLAs to intervene, to national media attention. Proponents involved in assisting the Rio Theatre in the short term, who also called on the province of British Columbia to amend its antiquated liquor laws in the long term, included British Columbia (BC) member of the Legislative Assembly Spencer Chandra Herbert, City of Vancouver councillor Heather Deal, and Vancouver mayor Gregor Robertson, among others. There were no known opponents to the newly licensed Rio Theatre also continuing to show unlicensed general-admission movies.

In response, the LCLB claimed that it was not able to alter its procedures due to the regulations of the BC Liquor Control and Licensing Act. The LCLB also stated that it was acting in the interests of "public safety" to prevent the possibility of minors consuming alcohol "in the dark", despite the fact that the Rio had agreed to not sell alcohol during general admission film screenings. On February 9, 2012, the BC government announced that they were making changes to the province's liquor licensing rules to allow venues that serve alcohol to also screen movies, albeit at different times.

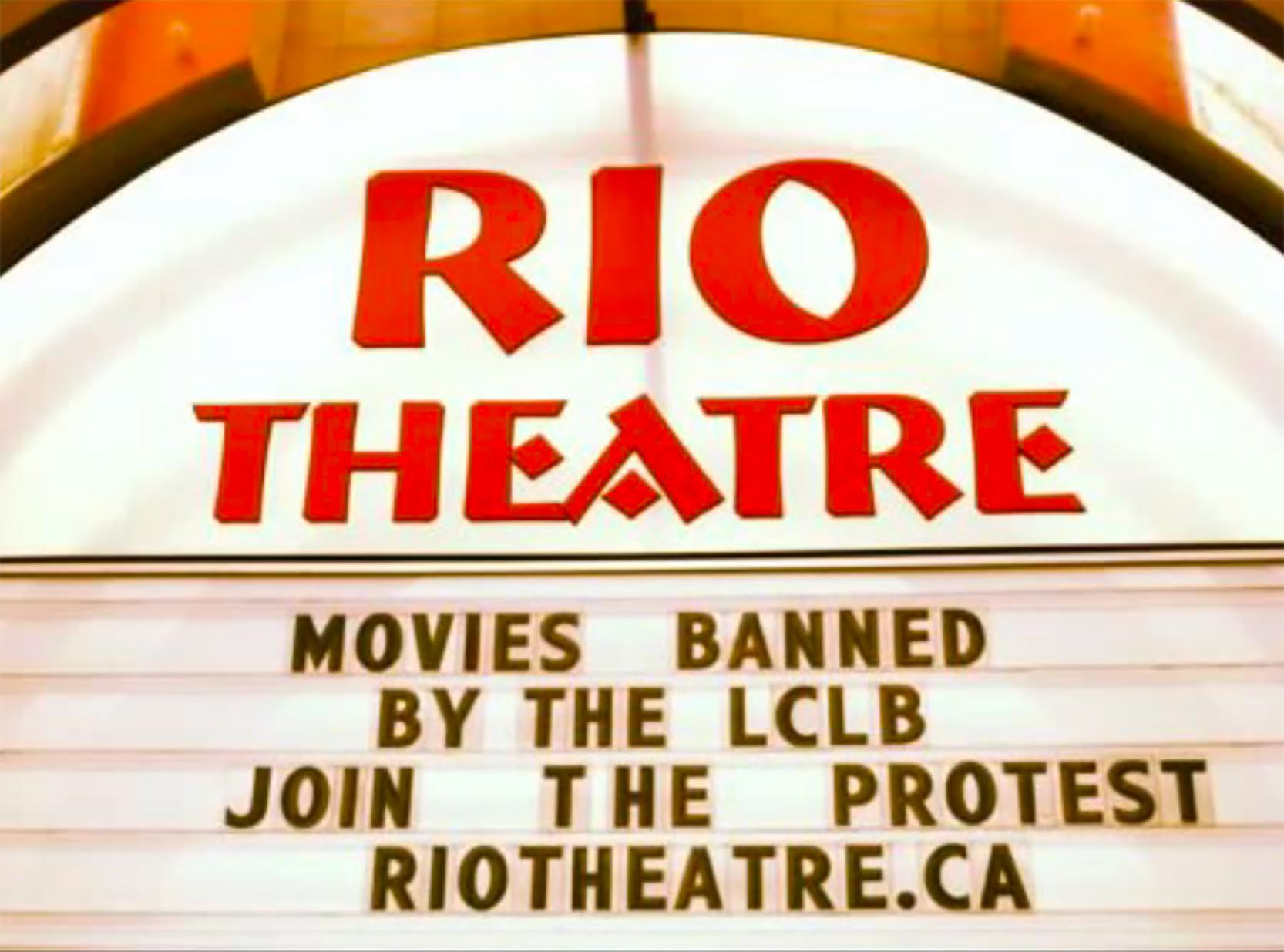
The Rio Theatre centre marquee stating "Movies Banned By the LCBC Join The Protest"

Lea did not accept these limited restrictions placed on her business. She kept on with her campaign to change the BC liquor laws so that alcohol could be served during movies and live events. The battle took four months in total while the Rio Theatre struggled to survive, going severely in debt during this time. In April 2012, the province's liquor laws were finally changed to allow all movie theatres with a primary liquor license in BC to serve alcohol during film screenings. Later in January 2013, Lea was awarded a Diamond Jubilee Governor General award for her successful battle to change the liquor laws.

== "Save the Rio" campaign ==
In 2018, the Rio Theatre staged a "Save the Rio" campaign to garner community support after local developers expressed interest in buying the building. The campaign was partly crowdsourced through the website Indiegogo, as well as through sources such as direct donations and a petition. Several notable figures in the film industry – including Ryan Reynolds, Seth Rogen, and Kevin Smith – publicly expressed support for the campaign, with Smith hosting multiple fundraising events at the theatre.

After seven months of campaigning, the owners of the theatre were eventually successful in buying the property through a combination of donations from private citizens, public figures and investors, along with a $375,000 grant from the city of Vancouver. The grant was supplied under the condition that the theatre remain "primarily [...] a cinema and a live entertainment venue" for the next 10 years.
