= Sail Away =

Sail Away may refer to:

== Music ==
- Sail Away (musical), a 1961 musical by Noël Coward, or the title song

=== Albums ===
- Sail Away (Great White album) or the title song, 1994
- Sail Away (Randy Newman album), or the title song (see below), 1972
- Sail Away, by Tom Harrell, 1992

=== Songs ===
- "Sail Away" (David Gray song), 2001
- "Sail Away" (Randy Newman song), 1972
- "Sail Away" (The Rasmus song), 2005
- "Sail Away" (Sam Neely song), 1977; covered by the Oak Ridge Boys, 1979
- "Sail Away" (Urban Cookie Collective song), 1994
- "Orinoco Flow (Sail Away)", a 1988 song by Enya
- "Sail Away", by Badfinger from Airwaves, 1979
- "Sail Away", by Creedence Clearwater Revival from Mardi Gras, 1972
- "Sail Away", by Deep Purple from Burn, 1974
- "Sail Away", by Hans Hartz, 1991
- "Sail Away", by John Fogerty from Eye of the Zombie, 1986
- "Sail Away", by Jonas Brothers from The Album, 2023
- "Sail Away" by Lake Malawi from Lake Malawi EP,2025
- "Sail Away", by Neil Young from Rust Never Sleeps, 1979
- "Sail Away", by Peter Frampton from Somethin's Happening, 1974
- "Sail Away", by Status Quo from Thirsty Work, 1994
- "Sail Away", by Taylor Henderson from Burnt Letters, 2014
- "Sail Away", by the Thirst, 2007

== Other uses ==
- Sail Away (TV series), a 2001 American children's reality series
- Sail Away, a 1995 children's book by Donald Crews

== See also ==
- "Come Sail Away", a 1977 song by Styx
