= Cineplex Cinemas Beaches =

Defunct movie theatre in Toronto, Canada

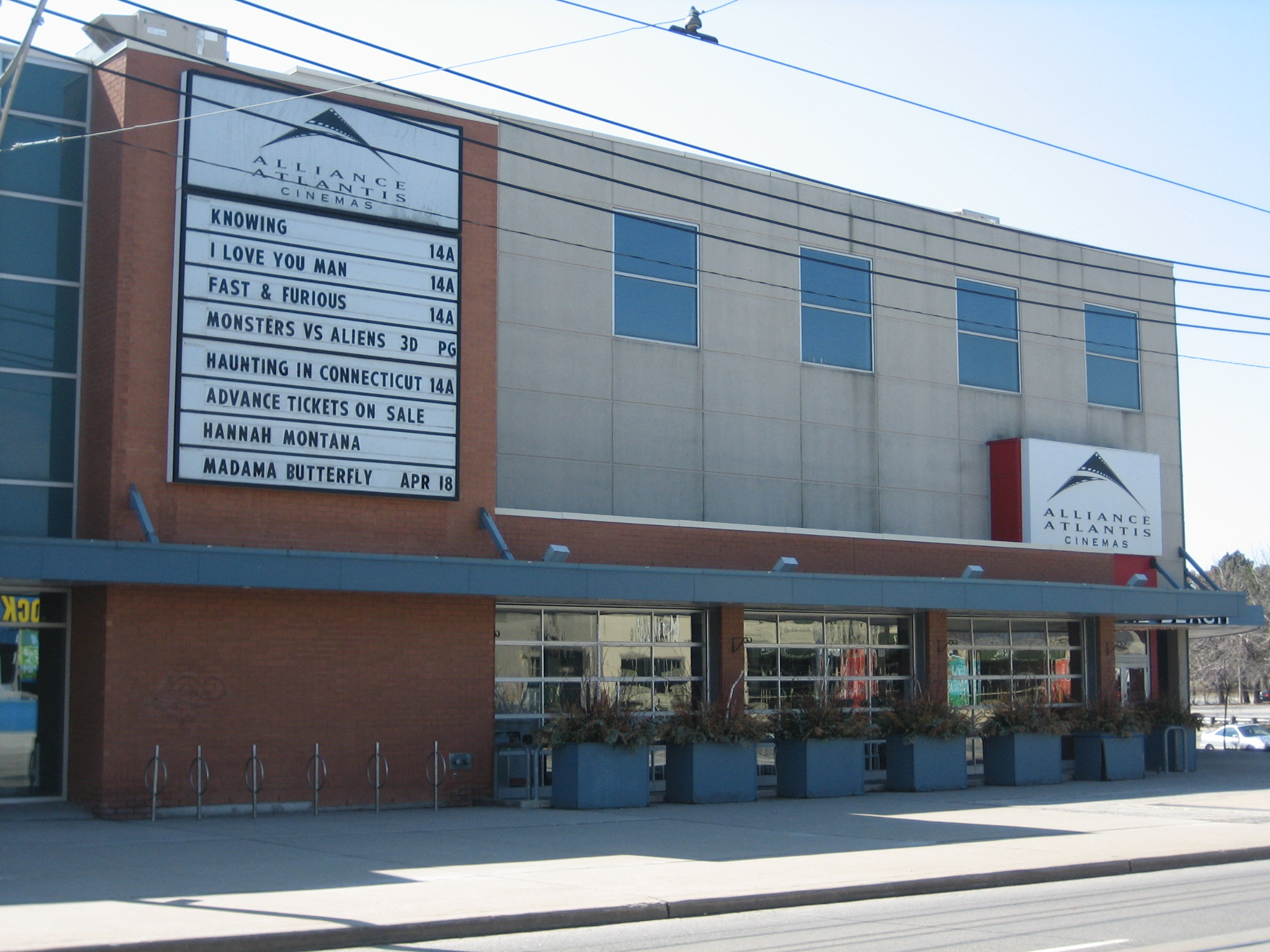
- The theatre in 2009, when it was operated by Alliance Cinemas
- Former names: Alliance Atlantis Beaches
- Address: 1651 Queen Street East; Toronto, Ontario; Canada
- Type: Movie theatre
- Screen: 6

Construction
- Opened: 1999
- Closed: 2026

Cineplex Cinemas Beaches (formally Alliance Atlantis Beaches) was a movie theatre located in the Beaches neighbourhood of Toronto, Ontario, Canada. It opened in 1999 and was operated by Alliance Cinemas until 2019, when Cineplex Entertainment began operating the theatre. It permanently closed on February 17, 2026.
