= Liquor license =

Official permit to sell alcoholic beverages

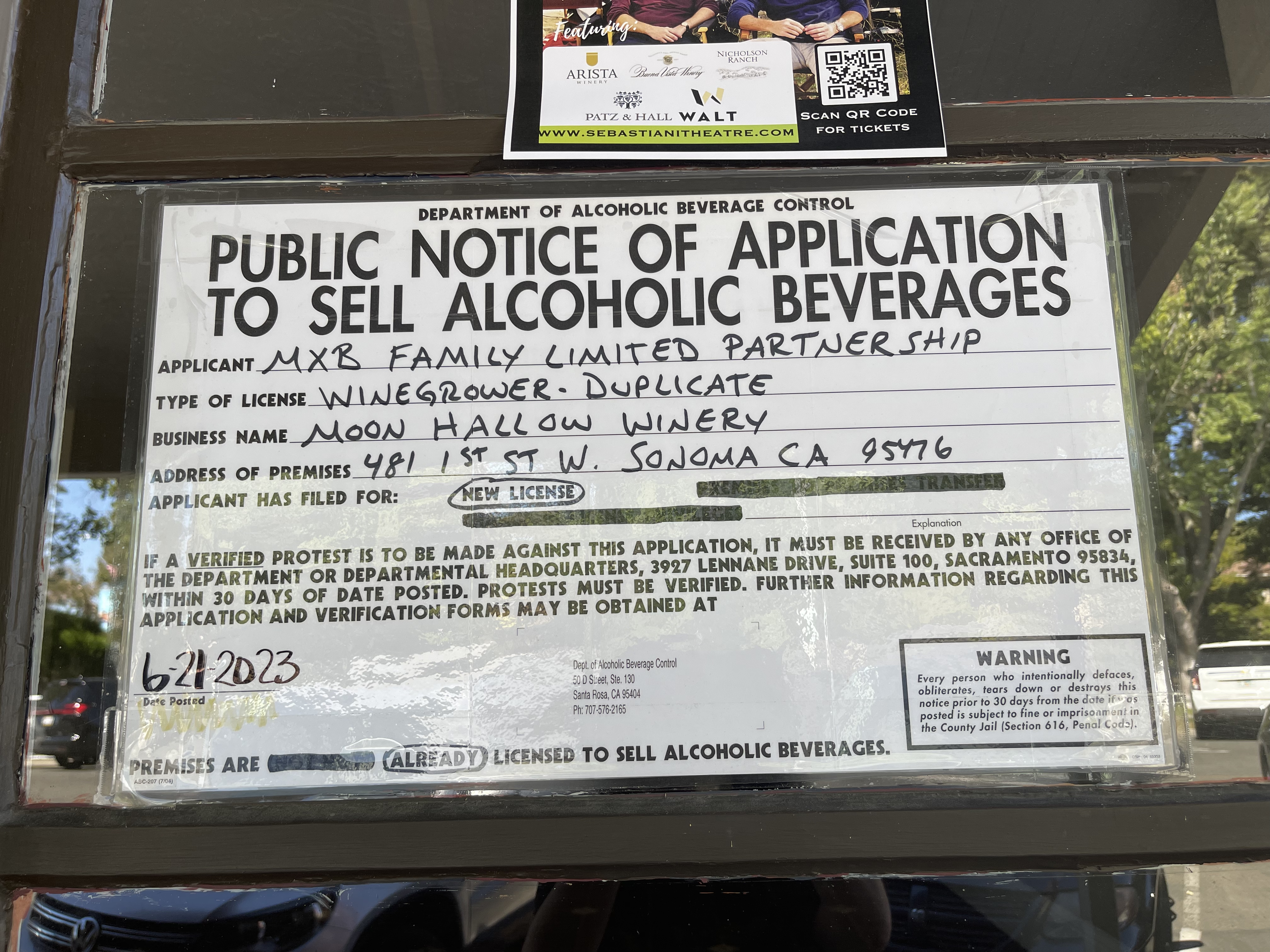
A public notice of an application to sell alcoholic beverages in Sonoma, California, in 2023

A liquor license (or liquor licence in most forms of Commonwealth English) is a government issued permit for businesses to sell, manufacture, store, or otherwise use alcoholic beverages.

== Canada ==
In Canada, liquor licenses are issued by the legal authority of each province to allow an individual or business to manufacture or sell alcoholic beverages. Usually several types of liquor licenses are available to apply for within each certain province. There are many regulations which apply to all types of liquor licenses. For example, each license must indicate the time, place and the maximum amount of sale. These licenses also apply to special events, which may occur outside of the normal setting in which alcohol is served. License holders must strictly follow all the terms and rules to avoid suspension, fines for non-compliance or revocation. Most provinces also specify identification regulations in determining eligibility of patrons. It is also law in Ontario that all individuals under 25 years of age must provide sufficient photo ID upon request.

=== Alberta ===
The Alberta Gaming and Liquor Commission (AGLC) licenses liquor activities in Alberta, pursuant to the Gaming, Liquor and Cannabis Act (formerly Gaming and Liquor Act), other provincial and federal legislation, and AGLC policies. The AGLC regulates Alberta's liquor industry, which was privatized in 1993 enabling the private sector to retail, warehouse, and distribute liquor in the province.

In Alberta, five classes of general licenses (and a variety of limited, special ones) are issued for the sale or other distribution, manufacture, storage, and other uses of alcoholic beverages:

- Class A licenses (for restaurants, lounges, etc.)
- Class B licenses (for recreational facilities, etc.)
- Class C licenses (for private clubs, canteens, etc.)
- Class D licenses (for retail liquor stores, hotel "off-sales", etc.), and
- Class E licenses (for hard-liquor manufacturing)
- Class F licenses (for breweries)
- Several special, limited licenses (private or public events, non-commercial competitions and tastings, industrial use and storage, and on-premises sampling at a manufacturer's site)

What is now Class F (brewing of beer, wine, and cider) was originally part of Class E, originally a general alcoholic-beverage manufacturing license.

=== British Columbia ===
The British Columbia government regulates and monitors the liquor industry to protect the public from the harm that may be caused by making and selling liquor or products that contain liquor. The B.C. Liquor Control and Licensing Branch (LCLB) regulates liquor service in bars and restaurants, private liquor stores, liquor manufacturers and importers, Ubrews and UVins (for personal liquor manufacturing) as well as liquor service at special occasion events. The Liquor Distribution Branch is responsible for the importation and distribution of liquor in B.C. and also operates government liquor stores. It is against the law to provide liquor that has not been certified by the Liquor Distribution Branch. Inspectors will visit establishments unannounced and if the establishment fails to comply with laws and regulations, seizure of liquor, fines, or suspension of license may follow.

=== Manitoba ===
Established in 1923, the Manitoba Liquor Control Commission (MLCC) serves as a regulating agency of alcohol sales and distributions in Manitoba. Its licensing board provides 12 types of liquor license applications, including Dining Room Licence, Cocktail Lounge Licence, Spectator Activities Licence, etc. Beside basic requirements for licensed premises such as proper seating capacities, the licensing board also reviews criminal record check and security plans before issuing a liquor license.

=== Nova Scotia ===
Established in 1930, and headquartered in Halifax, the Nova Scotia Liquor Corporation is the sole distributor and runs all retail outlets selling alcohol except for four private wine specialty shops and, in rural areas where there is not an NSLC location, 23 private "agency" liquor stores. In the former Liquor Commission was restructured as a Crown corporation and became the Liquor Corporation.

=== Ontario ===
The Liquor Licensing Board of Ontario (LLBO) was the regulatory agency responsible for issuing liquor permits and regulating the sale, service and consumption of alcoholic beverages in Ontario to promote moderation and responsible use within the province. Established in 1947 under the Liquor Licence Act (Ontario), the agency is not to be mistaken with the Liquor Control Board of Ontario (LCBO), an alcohol retailer. The LLBO was replaced by the Alcohol and Gaming Commission of Ontario in 1998 under the Alcohol and Gaming Regulation and Public Protection Act (Ontario) passed in 1996. The LLBO name lives on in many eateries and entertainment establishments which display official certification to indicate the location is legally licensed to serve alcohol.

=== Quebec ===
The province of Quebec has its own special laws concerning selling liquor and acquiring a liquor license. The Régie des alcools, des courses et des jeux is in charge of liquor distribution and sets the laws on liquor consumption. The permits authorizing the sale or service of alcoholic beverages within the territory concerning liquor permits concluded between the Government and a Mohawk community are determined in the agreement and issued by the authority designated in the agreement. For example, in Quebec all places that are able to receive a liquor license except grocery stores (available but until 11pm) are able to operate every day, from 8 o'clock in the morning to 3 o'clock in the morning in selling liquor. In Quebec, strong liquors and spirits (generally over 15%-20% abv.) are restricted for sale only in SAQ outlets (provincially-owned liquor retailers) as well at bars and other establishments with the requisite permit. All other types of liquor, as well as beer, shooters and other alcohol-derivative beverages are permitted to be sold at gas stations as well as supermarkets.

=== Saskatchewan ===
The Saskatchewan Liquor and Gaming Authority (SLGA) is the corporation responsible for the distribution and regulation of alcohol in the province of Saskatchewan.

Types of personal use permits issued in Saskatchewan include:

- Sale permit: These permits last for 12 hours and are authorized for charitable, educational, religious or community service functions. Prices for the alcoholic beverages served are set by the permit holder.
- Non-sale permit: These permits are used to authorize the serving of alcohol at functions outside a private dwelling, including weddings, staff parties, or reunions. Alcoholic beverages are not allowed to be sold with this permit.
- Cost-recovery permit: These permits are issued to private individuals for private functions such as weddings and reunions that are not eligible for a regular sale permit. Alcoholic beverages can be sold with this permit, but the price is limited to $2 per drink or the cost of the beverage (whichever is greater). Due to the price limit, these are often referred to as "toonie bars."

Businesses seeking authorization to serve alcoholic beverages must complete the Commercial Liquor Permit Application.

Types of commercial liquor licenses issued in Saskatchewan include:

- Tavern license: Issued primarily for the purpose of selling alcohol in public establishments including bars, pubs, restaurants and nightclubs.
- Special-use license: Issued for restaurants that do not primarily focus on alcoholic beverages but are served on special occasions.
- Manufacturer license: Issued to authorize applicants with establishments primarily based on the manufacturing of alcoholic beverages.

== Europe ==
=== Finland ===
In Finland, a liquor license from the Regional State Administrative Agency (Aluehallintavirasto) is needed for businesses manufacturing, serving or importing alcohol. Licenses are usually non-limited but licenses for limited periods also exist.

A liquor license can be granted to any mature natural or legal person who has not been declared bankrupt. Persons applying for a license also need to be able to support themselves financially and be generally trustworthy. There also separate rules for the premises alcohol is served in. Liquor licenses are not transferable.

Before 2018 Finnish liquor licenses were divided into classes A, B and C. A class A license allowed serving alcohol up to 80% per volume, a B class license up to 22% volume and a C class license only fermented beverages up to 4.7% per volume.

In 2020, the typical cost for a liquor license in Finland was 450 to 650 euro. In November 2020, Finland had about 9 thousand active liquor licenses.

=== Germany ===
Germany does not require any licenses for the production, wholesale, or retail sale (off-license) of alcoholic beverages. A Gaststättenkonzession is required when alcoholic beverages are sold for consumption on the premises (on-license).

=== Sweden ===
In Sweden retailers are not allowed to sell alcoholic beverages above 3.5% alcohol by volume. Only Systembolaget, the government-owned alcohol monopoly, is allowed to sell these products.

Liquor licenses (Swedish: serveringstillstånd or utskänkningstillstånd) for restaurants, bars, and similar premises are issued by the local municipality. There are some basic provisions in the Alcohol Act to take into account, for example:

- Serving of alcohol must not be carried out before 11:00
- The premises must also serve food to serve alcohol
- Serving of alcohol is not allowed to people below 18 years of age
- Alcoholic beverages are not allowed to be served to a person that is visibly intoxicated

Most licenses allow liquor service between 11:00–01:00, but there are exceptions. Some restaurants have limited hours on weekdays but are allowed to serve longer on weekends. Many dance venues are allowed to serve until 03:00 or 05:00, often combined with the condition that the restaurant has doorman or similar control.

=== United Kingdom ===
Throughout the United Kingdom, the sale of alcohol is only authorized for pubs, restaurants, shops, and other premises that are officially licensed by the local authority. The individual responsible for the premises must also hold a personal license. Premises licenses can be categorized into two different kinds:

- On-licenses: allowing consumption of alcohol on the premises.
- Off-licenses: alcohol must be removed from the vendor's premises and consumed elsewhere.

== United States ==
In the United States, liquor licenses are issued separately by each individual state. Majority licenses are often specified by each state and localities that have laws and regulations in acquiring such a license. Otherwise, general categories that are covered under license laws include when and where liquor may be served, the amount that can be served, how much it may be served for, and to whom it may be served. Across the United States it is very common to have further specified protocols in restaurants such as limits on drinks per customer, zero discounts on drinks, and to have unfinished bottles of wine to remain in the restaurant. Furthermore, there may be several choices of license classes depending on how one intends to sell the alcoholic beverages. The most common overall types of licenses required for bars and restaurants include:

- Beer-and-wine license: Depending on jurisdiction, this may be the most common or second most common type. It does not include any strong alcohols or spirits, and typically permits sales of beer, wine, cider, and malt liquor beverages up to the alcohol-by-volume range of wines.
- Restaurant liquor license: Also known as the all-liquor or general license, it is the most or second-most generally used license, depending on jurisdiction. Some states, counties, and municipalities permit most or all restaurants only to have beer-and-wine licenses (see below), or may limit restaurants to such a license for a period of time (such as six months to two years). Some states (e.g., New Mexico) issue so few all-liquor licenses that newer restaurants can only obtain a beer-and-wine license unless a full license becomes available and the venue can afford the high price for which it will sell (or, technically, transfer).
- Tavern (bar) liquor license: This license is commonly required for businesses with 50% or more of their sales in liquor, and this may include many restaurants that serve alcohol as well as food. Not all jurisdictions separate this license from the all-liquor restaurant license.

Most US jurisdictions also divide licenses by on-premises consumption (bar and restaurant) and off-premises (bottle) sales. Certain venues can sometimes have both license types, e.g. a craft brewery that both operates as a tavern and sells bottled beer to go.

It is important for wholesale liquor vendors in the United States to verify authenticity and validity of liquor licenses before selling, because insurance companies do not cover claims related to alcohol if there is no valid liquor license involved.

In addition, some states have mandated "server permits" for those who serve alcoholic beverages.

=== California ===
The Department of Alcoholic Beverage Control (ABC) in California was established in 1955. California ABC has the power to issue, deny, suspend, or revoke any specific alcoholic beverage license. The department has three divisions: administration, licensing and compliance and each division has specific responsibilities.

The types of retail licenses in California are:

- On-sale general: licensing the sale of all types of alcoholic beverages.
- Off-sale general: licensing the sale of all types of alcoholic beverages in sealed containers for consumption off the premises.
- On-sale beer and wine: licensing the sale of all types of wine and malt beverages.
- Off-sale beer and wine: licensing the sale of all types of wine and malt beverages in sealed containers for consumption off the premises.
- On-sale beer: licensing the sale of malt beverages.

Each license requires a different application process.

California ABC has departmental investigators with police authority, who are responsible for investigating and making arrests for violations.

=== New York ===
The New York State Liquor Authority (SLA) and the Division of Alcoholic Beverage Control (ABC) are responsible for regulating and controlling the manufacture and distribution of alcoholic beverages within New York State. Established in 1934 under New York State law, these agencies are currently responsible for controlling all liquor-related activities. The main responsibilities of the Division of Alcoholic Beverage Control include reviewing and investigating applicants to determine eligibility, issuing and limiting the number and type of licenses, and regulating trade of alcoholic beverages at wholesale and retail.

According to the SLA and the ABC, an applicant must satisfy the following requirements for liquor license eligibility:

- Be at least 21 years of age
- Have no conviction records
- Not a police officer with arresting powers

=== Oregon ===
In the state of Oregon, the Oregon Liquor Control Commission (OLCC) regulates and controls the distribution, sales, and consumption of alcoholic beverages.

=== Texas ===
The Texas Alcoholic Beverage Commission (TABC) previously known as Texas Liquor Control Board is the agency responsible for enforcing regulations and laws concerning the sales of alcoholic beverages within the state of Texas. Introduced in 1935 and headquartered in Austin, the agency has followed the basic laws of the Alcoholic Beverage Code while issuing nearly 100,000 permits and liquor licenses per year. The basic requirements to be authorized with a liquor license include citizenship, 21 years of age or older, and successful completion of specified application forms.

The types of liquor licenses issued in Texas include:

- BG permit: Authorizes a restaurant or bar to sell beer and wine that can be consumed on and off site.
- MB permit: Authorizes a restaurant or bar to sell beer, wine, mixed drinks and other hard liquors only to be consumed on site.
- Q permit: Authorizes a retailer to sell wine which may be consumed off the premises of the store.
- BF permit: Similar the Q permit, the BF permit allows a retailer to sell beer instead of wine which can be consumed off premises.

== India ==
Various types of licenses are issued by each state government. Any individual or company can get the following licenses:

Grant of L-1 license: For the purpose of wholesale supply of Indian Liquor. The government of NCT of Delhi once a year formulates policies for grant of this license in pursuance of which it's granted to the wholesale supply of Indian liquor. It's granted to Company or a society or a partnership firm or proprietorship firm having licensed manufacturing units (distillery/brewery/winery/bottling plant).

- Procedure for application of this license: The government invites applications by issuing a public notice during a leading newspaper and on the official website of the government.
- The prime job of L-1 Licensee is to provide liquor to the holders of Licenses of L-6, L-7, L-9, L-10, L-12, L-13, L-14, L-15, L-16, L-17, L-18, L-19, L-20, L-21, L-28, L-29 and other liquor licenses within the capital Territory of Delhi.
- The holder of L-1 license has got to suits all the terms and conditions mentioned within the license contract.

Grant of L-3/L-5 Licences: For hotels. Such license can be granted for hotels, which are holding star classification and the approval from Tourism Department of Government of India which is taken into account necessary for grant of License in form L-3.

- L-3 license authorizes the hotel for offering foreign liquor to the customers in their rooms.
- These hotels also can seek separate License in form L-5 for serving the liquor in exclusive bars and therefore the restaurants within the hotel premises.

Grant of L-19 License: For clubs. L-19 license can be issued to a club registered with the Registrar of Firms/Registrar of Cooperative Societies for facilitate of foreign liquor to its members.

Grant of L-49A license: Marriages, parties, etc. This license can be obtained on payment of Rs. 3000 for serving of liquor in any party, function, marriage, etc. at a particular premises anywhere in Delhi exclusive of public parks subject to the following conditions.

- The area should be away from public view.
- Liquor should be served to adults above 25 years of age.
- Liquor should be procured from authorized source in Delhi.

== New Zealand ==
New Zealand has laws similar to those of the United Kingdom, but it further separates two other licenses.

- On-licenses: allowing consumption of alcohol on the premises.
- Off-licenses: alcohol must be removed from the vendor's premises and drunk elsewhere, but must not be a dairy (suprette is exempt, but not advisable in a school zone) and petrol station.
- Club licenses: effectively an on-license inside a club house for club members, club members with reciprocal rights (e.g. all Returned Servicemens Association clubs in the country), and guests of members that are registered by members for the day.
- Special licenses: for extending liquor selling hours past the normal times (3 am in a pub because of a live coverage of sport events overseas, increasingly uncommon after the Sale and Supply of Liquor Act 2012 came into effect), or for granting on- or off-licenses for a site that normally does not sell alcohol for the purpose of a series of events or a one-off event (e.g., a beer festival at a convention centre, or selling holiday mulled wine in an otherwise unlicensed cafe). It is also used for exemptions from the days in which it is forbidden to sell alcohol – e.g., Christmas Day, Easter Sunday (except for vineyards from 2004 amendment), Good Friday, and before 1pm on ANZAC Day.

== See also ==
- Alcohol law
