= BC Liquor Distribution Branch =

Governmental body in Canada

- Type: Division of Government
- Industry: Retail
- Founded: 1921; 105 years ago
- Headquarters: Burnaby, British Columbia, Canada
- Products: Liquor and cannabis sales and distribution to both consumers and businesses permitted by law
- Owner: Government of British Columbia
- Number of employees: 4,200
- Website: bcldb.com

The BC Liquor Distribution Branch (BCLDB) is the governmental body responsible for distributing alcohol and cannabis products in the province of British Columbia, Canada. The BCLDB operates under the Ministry of Public Safety and Solicitor General and was established in 1921 as the Liquor Control Board. Effective July 17th, 2025 the BCLDB was transferred to the Ministry of Agriculture and Food. Its head office is located in Burnaby, with distribution centres in Delta, Kamloops, and Richmond.

The BCLDB is the only organization allowed to purchase, import, and distribute alcoholic beverages in British Columbia. The organization employs more than 4,200 people, and operate over 230 liquor and cannabis stores (as of December 2024) under the BC Liquor Stores and BC Cannabis Stores names, found all across the province, making the BCLDB one of the top employers in the entire province. The other governmental body which is responsible for regulating and monitoring the industry is the Liquor and Cannabis Regulation Branch (LCRB), with a similar mandate. The BCLDB contributes ~1 billion Canadian dollars to the British Columbian provincial government through sales annually.

== History ==
=== Background ===
Prior to introduction of morality laws, liquor consumption in British Columbia (along with the rest of Canada) was heavy and common. Saloons were the favoured establishments for this drinking, with the core of the future city of Vancouver having been built around one such saloon operated by Gassy Jack. British Columbia's demographic makeup in particular was young and heavily male-skewed, with the city of Vancouver having a 3:2 ratio of men outnumbering women. For many of these men, similarly to other cities across Canada, drinking was one of the few recreational pastimes available to them, and thus drinking took on social importance in the development of a working-class subculture.

With the rapid influx in immigration during the late 1800s, the increase of Canada's population and the massive, industrially driven expansion of Canadian cities, came resistance to the perceived moral threat posed by the rapid changes prompted by rapid industrialization and urbanization. One such concern and area for resistance was in the opposition to the consumption of liquor. Viewed as a moral hazard, predominantly middle class organized political opposition began to take shape in the forms of temperance movements across the Anglosphere in the mid-1800s, with groups such as the American Women's Christian Temperance Union, or WCTU, extending to British Columbia by 1882. These movements sought to eradicate the culture of excessive drinking through political means and laws meant to police the conduct of morals.

There was some truth to their arguments. In Vancouver, as in other major Canadian cities, much of the time spent policing was the policing of public drunkenness: Up to 25% of arrests made in Vancouver during the early 1910s were arrests for public drunkenness. It however was also tied to ethnic and racial discrimination, as ethnic enclaves such as the Chinese community and other non-Caucasian groups were perceived as driving moral decays. Restrictions would therefore first come to those groups, with indigenous Canadians forbidden from purchasing liquor licenses in 1887. Chinese Canadians and other non-Caucasian groups would follow in 1910. Sunday laws and other societal regulations on moral conduct in saloon behaviour such as the banning of women would follow, but lingering opposition to the Temperance movement in British Columbia prevented a full prohibition.

=== Prohibition and establishment ===
The strain placed upon Canadian society by the First World War would prove to be the factor that tilted the debate solidly in favour of the temperance movements, albeit temporarily. With resources normally available for the production of alcohol needed to fuel Canada's war effort temperance groups seized on the sudden political support offered to them Canada-wide. Attacks deriding excessive drinking and the lack of productivity of drunkards were pointed as 'aiding the Kaiser', generating popular opposition to excessive drinking. By 1916, the temperance movement in British Columbia was powerful enough to call for and receive a provincial plebiscite on the consumption of alcohol. With soldier's overseas ballots forbidden from being cast, the vote would pass and in 1917 a provincial law banning the purchase of alcoholic beverages would come into effect.

However, while the vote had succeeded the issue was far from settled. Hotels would continue to operate by serving "near-beer," a light beer which contained less spirits per litre than the required amount to be legally considered beer. Many would simply illegally sell beer under this guise of selling near-beer. Prohibition laws were difficult for the police to enforce, allowing for illegal bootlegging to be rampant throughout the province. Political opposition to the ineffective policies would soon couple with popular resentment due to the economic depression. By 1920 the Provincial Government, seeing alcohol once again become a political issue and seeking to avoid entanglement allowed a second vote, asking voters if they would prefer prohibition or government-controlled 'moderation' policies. The decisive vote in favour of moderation would make British Columbia the first English-speaking province to repeal Prohibition, and prompted the government to establish a three-man Liquor Control Board in 1921 to oversee the government sale of liquor. Government agents would operate stores in communities across British Columbia, offering liquor and ostensibly giving advice on moderation. The government had economic reasonings in mind in addition to political ones; with the American Prohibition underway, it was expected that American tourists would flock to British Columbia to purchase liquor. In this way, the government estimated that they could pay off the provincial debt through liquor sales in 10-15 years.

Meanwhile, bootlegging to the United States had become a major economy booster for the government, as many Americans simply travelled to British Columbia to purchase alcohol, then drove it back across the border. Other bootleggers were more sophisticated with their methods, purchasing liquor licenses from the Liquor Control Board with the ostensible purpose of exporting liquor to far-off destinations in Central and South America from their warehouses in Vancouver and on the Gulf Islands. The federal government was pressured by the American government to forbid this practice, but as it was fully legal under federal and provincial jurisdictions there was little they could do. To satiate the American demands, the price of the liquor export license was raised to $10,000, resulting in bootleggers simply banding together, forming liquor export groups. One such company was led by Henry Reifel, who then came to controversy with the Liquor Control Board over his financial support of the British Columbian Liberal party, with the resultant scandal eventually proving a factor in the fall of the Liberal government.

High prices of liquor at government stores had been initially implemented both to maximise profit and to discourage excessive drinking in line with the province's mandate to moderate people's habits. However, this approach backfired somewhat as many British Columbians simply turned to the now widespread bootlegging industry for cheaper prices. The situation was summed up by a provincial Member of the Legislative Assembly (MLA) who colorfully described the situation as being "One half of Vancouver [...] bootlegging to the other 50%." With pressure mounting and economic viability slipping, the Liquor Control Board made the decision to allow hotels to serve beer in their parlours under strict regulation to preserve morality laws, including the initial total ban of women and later the segregation of women from male-spaces. Meanwhile, government stores steadily dropped their prices through the 1930s while preserving moral laws, seeing increased business by the end of the 1920s, though the Great Depression would soon see those sales reduced once again.

== Retail ==
=== BC Liquor Stores ===
As of December 2024, the BCLDB operates 198 liquor stores across British Columbia.

=== BC Cannabis Stores ===
On December 5, 2017, the BC provincial government determined that the BC Liquor Distribution Branch would be the sole distributor of non-medical cannabis. On October 17, 2018, the day that the Cannabis Act took effect, the first cannabis store opened in Kamloops. An online store also operates allowing consumers to purchase cannabis products online which is delivered by mail.

== See also ==
- Société des alcools du Québec
- Liquor Control Board of Ontario
- Alberta Gaming and Liquor Commission
- Saskatchewan Liquor and Gaming Authority
- Manitoba Liquor Control Commission
