= Festival Cinemas =

Canadian cinema chain

Festival Cinemas was founded in 1978 in Vancouver, British Columbia. The purpose of Festival was to show Canadian specialty art and other high quality films.

In 2013, the two theatres comprising the Festival chain in Vancouver were the Fifth Avenue Cinemas and the Park Theatre. A third, the Ridge Theatre, closed its doors on February 3, 2013, and was demolished to make way for condominiums.

On February 15, 2013, it was announced that the remaining two theatres would be sold to Cineplex Entertainment, effective March 1, 2013.
