= Liquor and Cannabis Regulation Branch =

Government agency in British Columbia, Canada

Agency overview
- Jurisdiction: British Columbia
- Website: www2.gov.bc.ca/gov/content/employment-business/business/liquor-regulation-licensing

The Liquor and Cannabis Regulation Branch (formerly the Liquor Control and Licensing Branch) is the agency of the government of British Columbia, within the Ministry of the Public Safety and Solicitor General, responsible for issuing liquor licenses in the province and for enforcing the provisions of the Liquor Control and Licensing Act.

British Columbia's government also has a separate Liquor Distribution Branch, which is responsible for operating the province's monopoly on the sale of alcoholic beverages.

The BC Liquor Distribution Branch is one of the world's largest importers, distributors and retailers of wines, beer and spirits. All wine, spirits, and beer are distributed to a network of government-run and privately owned liquor stores as well as restaurants, bars and pubs. It was established in 1921 as the Liquor Control Board following the end of prohibition in British Columbia.
