= BC Liquor Stores =

Canadian provincial government-owned corporation

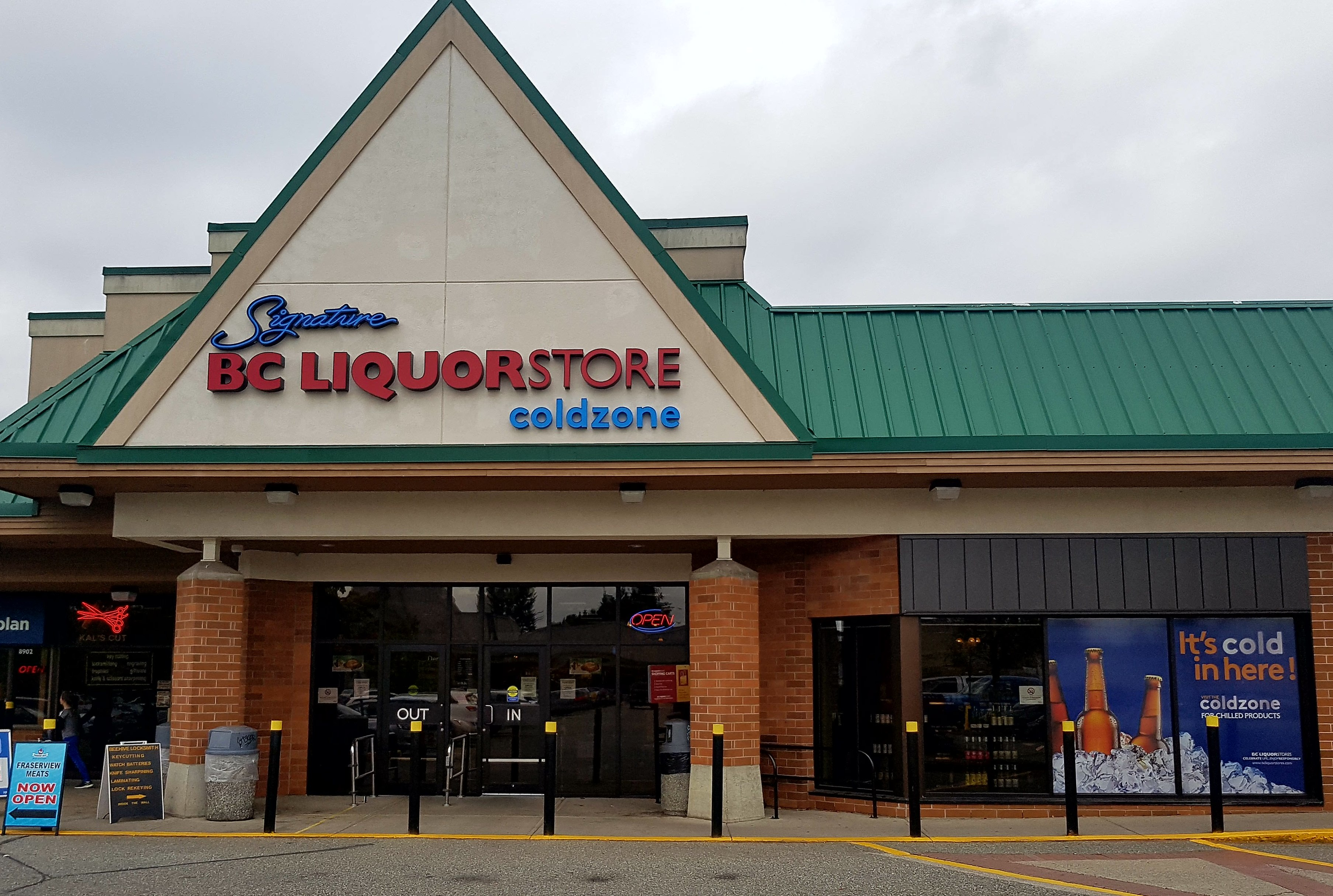
- BC Liquor Store in Fleetwood, Surrey
- Type: Crown corporation
- Industry: Retail
- Founded: June 21, 1921; 105 years ago
- Headquarters: Burnaby, British Columbia, Canada
- Number of locations: 198
- Key people: R. Blain Lawson – chief executive officer
- Products: Liquor sales and distribution (permitted by law)
- Revenue: $3.33 billion CAD (2016–17)
- Net income: $1.08 billion CAD (2016–17)
- Number of employees: 4,000 (2017)
- Website: www.bcliquorstores.com

BC Liquor Stores are a chain of government-owned and operated retail outlets operated by the British Columbia Liquor Distribution Branch to distribute alcoholic beverages in the province of British Columbia, Canada. They are accountable to the Attorney General of British Columbia. BC Liquor Stores currently operate 198 locations across the province. The chain was established in June 1921, following the result of a plebiscite in favour of liquor availability through government liquor stores. Before the plebiscite, alcohol had been outlawed by the Prohibition Act, introduced on May 23, 1916, with exceptions for sacramental, medicinal or industrial purposes.

== History ==
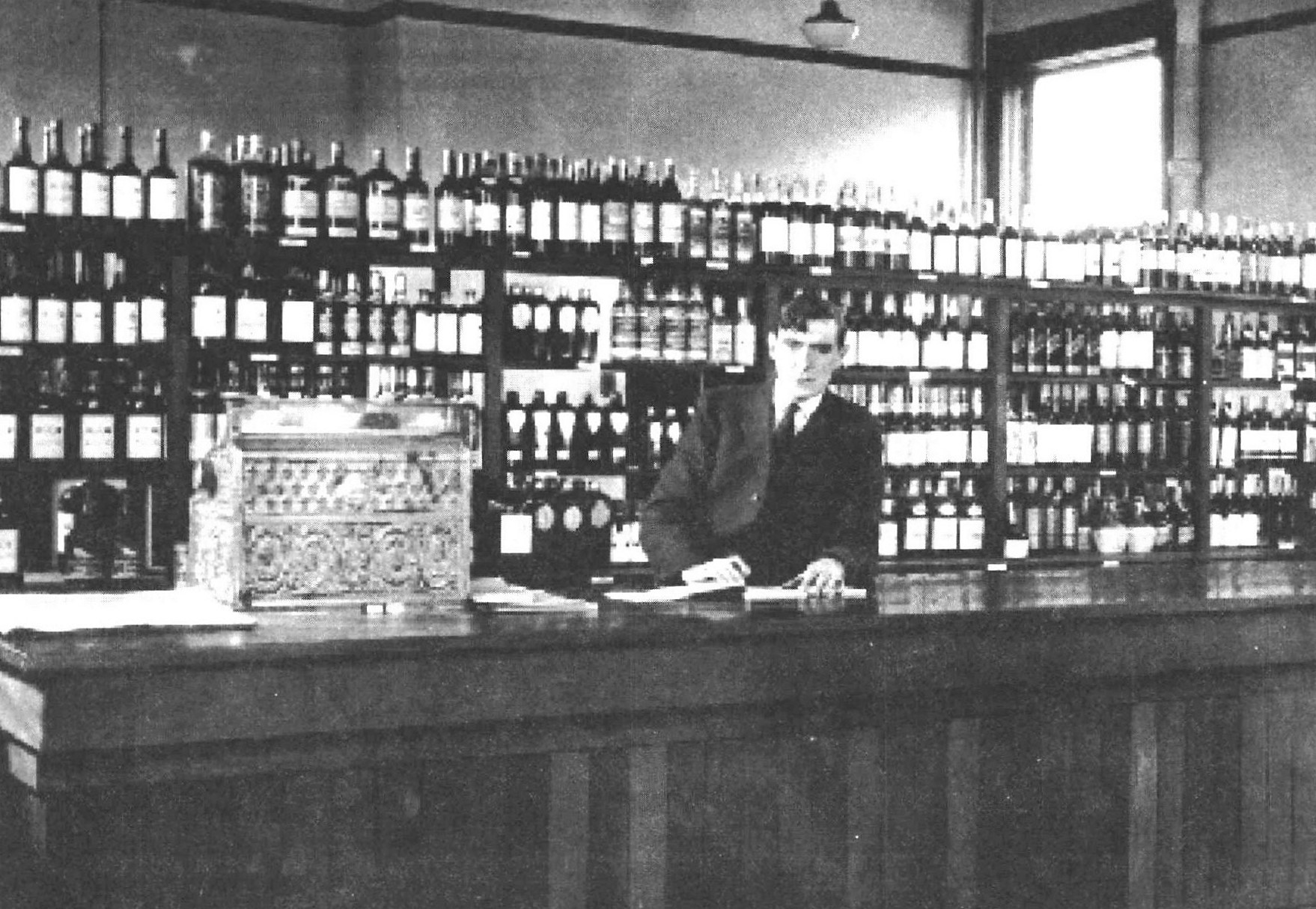
The interior of the Cloverdale liquor store in Cloverdale, Surrey in 1925

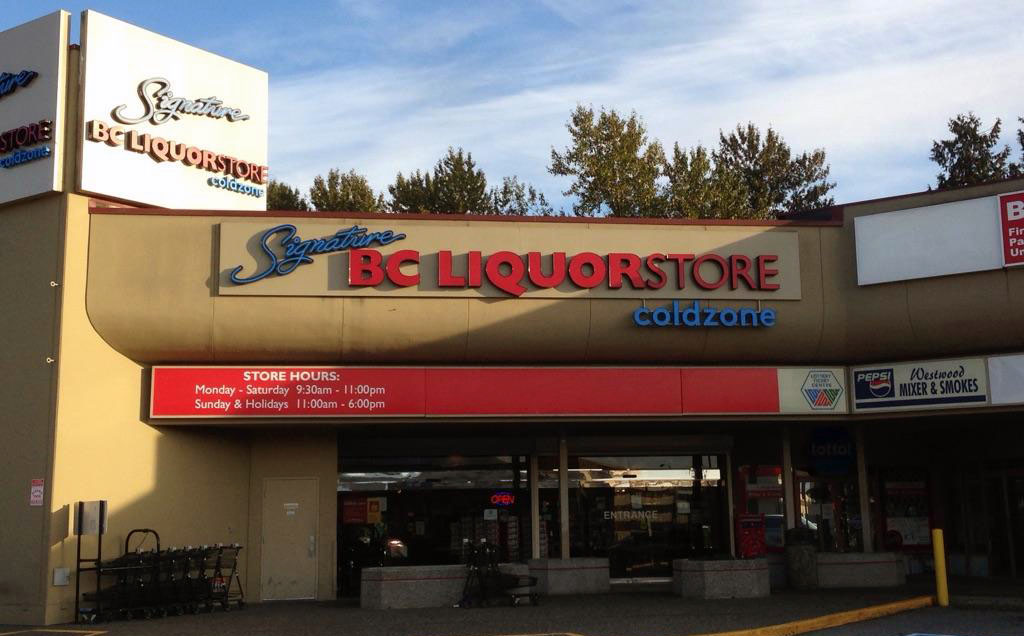
A Port Coquitlam location featuring the "Coldzone" branding

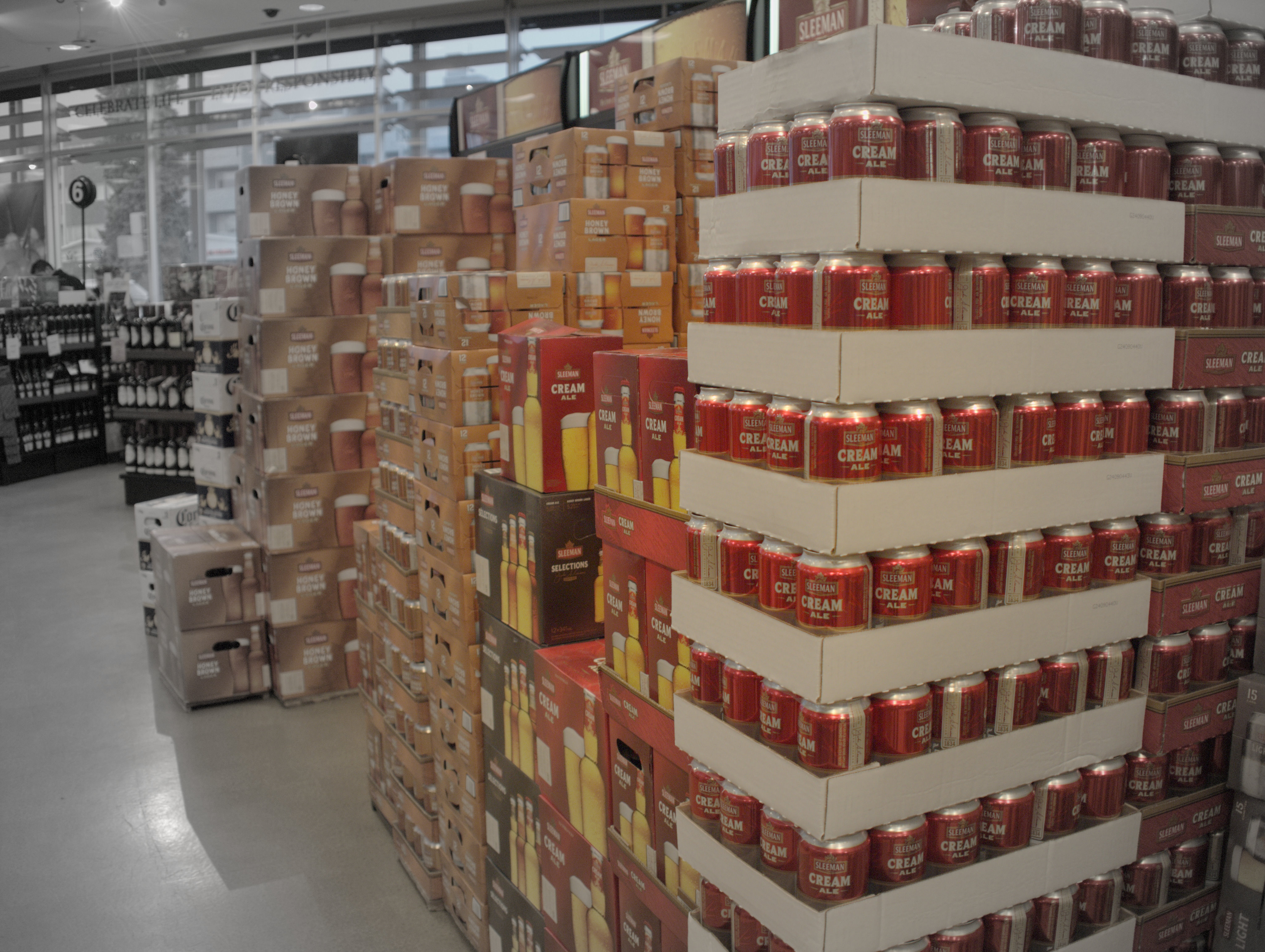
The interior of a BC Liquor Store, featuring an assortment of beer from Sleeman Breweries.

=== Prohibition era ===
The Prohibition Act was introduced by Conservative Premier William Bowser in May 1916. Its implementation into law was subject to a binding referendum question which took place on September 14, 1916. To the question "Are you in favour of bringing the B.C. Prohibition Act into force?"; 36,490 polled in favour and 27,217 opposed. To accommodate the votes of overseas soldiers, voting continued until December 1916. A royal commission was appointed to analyse the soldiers' votes against double-voting; over half of the soldiers' ballots were disallowed by the commission and prohibition took effect on October 1, 1917, under Harlan Carey Brewster's Liberal government.

On October 20, 1920, a plebiscite was held to end prohibition in favour of government control and moderation. The plebiscite passed in favour of ending prohibition 92,095 to 55,448. As of 1920, British Columbia had been the only province in Canada that had voted in favour of government-controlled liquor sales.

=== Government Liquor Act ===
On February 23, 1921, the Attorney General of British Columbia had introduced the Government Liquor Act. The act was passed in March of that year, and the first government-run liquor stores were opened on June 15, 1921 – the same day the Prohibition Act was repealed. Within the first week of the Government Liquor Act becoming law, 17 stores had been opened; by March 1922 at least one store had been opened in 32 of the 39 provincial electoral districts. The ability to purchase liquor was limited to those who purchased an annual liquor permit for five dollars and who were above 21 years of age.

British Columbians were not able to buy liquor by the glass between 1921 and 1924. A 1925 amendment of the Government Liquor Act allowed for the establishment of beer parlours.

=== Indian List ===
In 1887, British Columbia passed an act titled the Habitual Drunkards Act which restricted the ability of certain individuals to conduct business: any sale or contract involving them was considered void. The individuals encompassed by the act could not legally purchase liquor. Indigenous people were automatically placed on the list, preventing them from being able to purchase alcoholic beverages. This list was referred to as the "Indian List".

Some non-indigenous individuals were also added to the list based on misbehaviour after excessive drinking. In 1963, the Liquor Control Board chairman, Colonel Donald McGugan reported that 4,500–5,000 British Columbians were on the list. Though the members of the list would change, the total number of persons remained approximately the same. The Habitual Drunkards Act was eventually repealed in 1968.

=== Privatization ===
Since 1988, the Government of British Columbia has allowed private retail liquor stores. There was a moratorium in place between 1988 and 2002 which limited the number of new private retail licences that were issued. After the moratorium was lifted, it was observed that between 2002 and 2008 there was a 33% increase in private liquor stores and a 10% decrease in government stores.
