= Sail Away (TV series) =

American reality television series

- Created by: H. Marshall Golnick; Ellen Levy-Sarnoff
- Country of origin: United States
- No. of seasons: 1
- No. of episodes: 13

Production
- Executive producers: Susan Whittaker Pitnik; Ellen Levy-Sarnoff; Meryl Marshall Daniels; H. Marshall Golnick
- Running time: 30 Minutes (including commercials)
- Production companies: Two Oceans Entertainment Group; Levy-Sarnoff Productions

Original release
- Network: Discovery Kids
- Release: May 26 – July 7, 2001

Sail Away is an American reality television series which follows ten teenagers sailing aboard the Simpatico off the Bahamas with assistance from their leader Nicolas Popov and Dragan Popov. There are no plans for a second series. The series was produced by Discovery Kids. The first series was filmed in 2000, aired in early 2001 and consisted of 13 episodes.

== Overview ==
The series follows ten (13-15 year olds) teenagers as they sail a ship called the Simpatico just off the Bahamas. They are assisted by professional sailors Nicolas Popov and Dragan Popov. They have to learn to live in confined spaces, learn new skills and accept the differences between people. Each day they participate in challenges such as diving with sharks, exploring sunken wrecks and swimming with wild dolphins.

== Participants ==
=== Series 1 ===
- Calvin White
- Carlos Farias
- Zach Fentress
- Petra Harvey
- Alex Julius
- Aubrey Parsley
- Charlotte Ronveaux
- Geo Seery
- Whitney Berry
- Elie Haswell

== Episodes ==
No.	Title	Original release date
1	"Leaving Nassau"	26 May 2001
The participants begin their adventure by boarding the ship called Simpatico and start sailing just off the Bahamas and leaving the island Nassau
2	"Iguana Island"	4 June 2001
The participants' first stop is Iguana Island.
3	"Plane Wreck Dive"	4 June 2001
The participants have to dive to retrieve items from a sunken plane.
4	"Whitney Goes Home"	11 June 2001
Whitney is home sick and decides to leave.
5	"Thunderball Cave"	11 June 2001
The participants try to navigate through Thunderball Cave.
6	"Fat Albert and the Sea Park"	18 June 2001
The participants have fun at a Sea Park.
7	"Night Sail"	18 June 2001
The participants have to sail at night in a huge storm.
8	"Cat Island"	23 June 2001
As the mysterious Cat Island draws near the participants start getting egdy.
9	"Goombay Festival"	23 June 2001
The participants relax at the Goombay festival.
10	"Shark Dive"	30 June 2001
The participants have to face their fears by diving with sharks.
11	"Dolphins"	30 June 2001
The group go swimming with the dolphins.
12	"Sugar Wreck Dive"	7 July 2001
The participants dive to locate items from a shipwreck.
13	"Saying Goodbye"	7 July 2001
The participants have to say goodbye to one another as their ship docks at port.

== International Broadcasts ==
Country	Channel	Series Premiere
United States	Discovery Kids	2001
Latin America	Discovery Kids Latin America	2001
Australia	ABC3	2009

== Similar Productions ==
- Survive This
- Serious Ocean
