= Cannabis in Canada =

- Medicinal: Legal
- Recreational: Legal
- Hemp: Legal

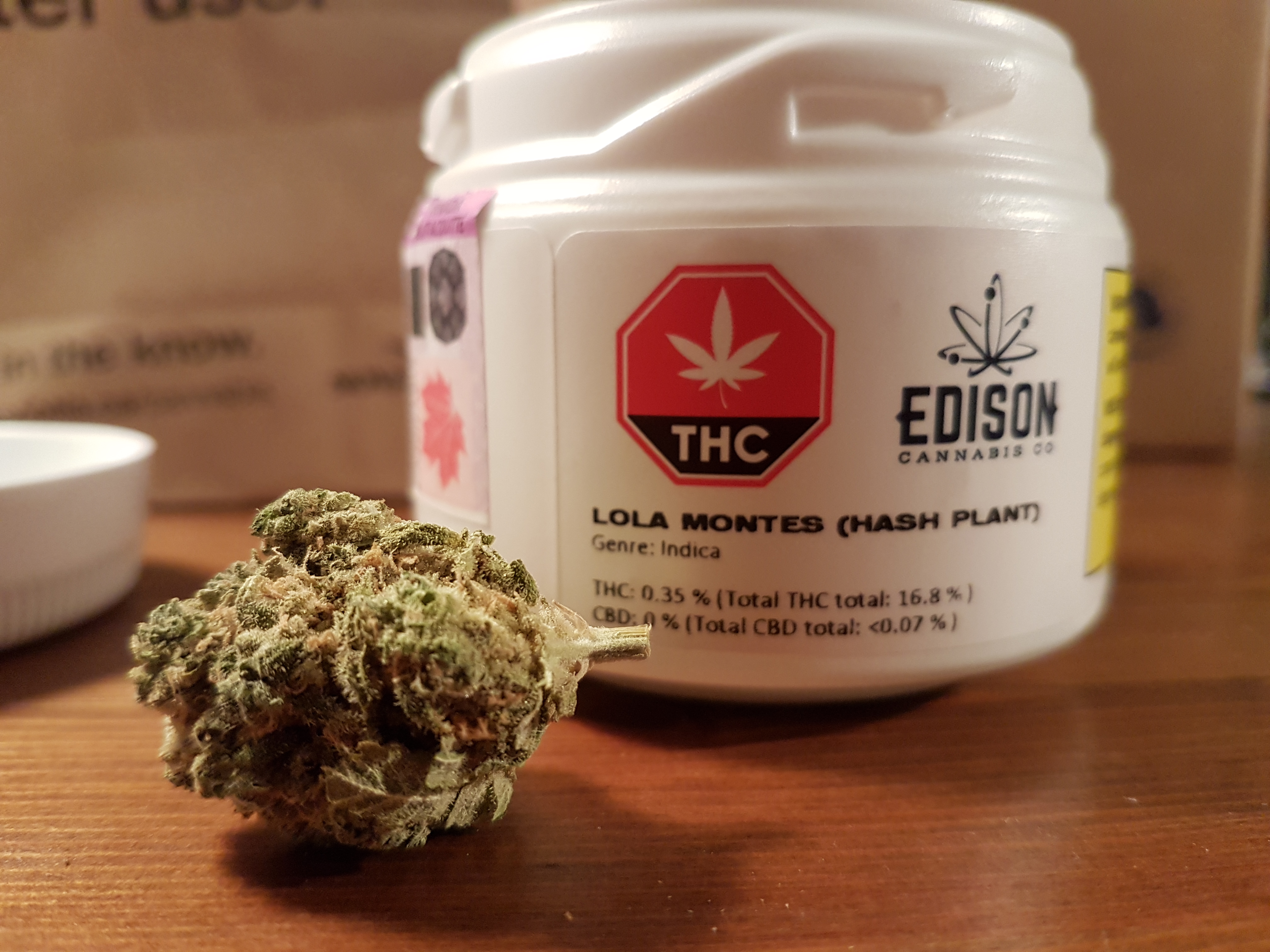
Cannabis flowers next to a plastic canister of 3.5 grams

Cannabis in Canada is legal for both recreational and medicinal purposes. Cannabis was originally prohibited in 1923 until medicinal use of cannabis was legalized nationwide under conditions outlined in the Marijuana for Medical Purposes Regulations issued by Health Canada, which regulated medical cannabis effective 30 July 2001, and was later superseded by the Access to Cannabis for Medical Purposes Regulations, which also permitted seed, grain, and fibre production under licence by Health Canada.

In response to popular opinion, the legislation to legalize cannabis for recreational use (Cannabis Act, Bill C-45) was passed by the House of Commons of Canada on 27 November 2017; it passed second reading in the Senate of Canada on 22 March 2018. On 18 June 2018, the House passed the bill with most, but not all, of the Senate's amendments. The Senate accepted this version of the Act the following day. The Cannabis Act took effect on 17 October 2018 and made Canada the second country in the world, after Uruguay, to formally legalize the cultivation, possession, acquisition, and consumption of cannabis and its by-products. Canada is the first G7 and G20 nation to do so. This legalization comes with regulation similar to that of alcohol in Canada: age restrictions, limiting home production, distribution, consumption areas and sale times. The process removed cannabis possession for personal consumption from the Controlled Drugs and Substances Act, while implementing taxation and stronger punishments for those convicted of either supplying cannabis to minors or of impairment while driving a motor vehicle.

As of January 2019, online sales of cannabis for recreational use were well underway across Canada, via the provincial or territorial governments. Most provinces also had storefront operations selling cannabis, either operated by the government or private enterprise.

== History ==
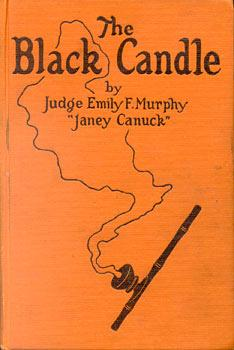
The cover of Murphy's 1922 book The Black Candle, that claimed "marijuana turned its users into homicidal maniacs"

Drug prohibition in Canada began with the Opium Act of 1908. Historians often point to the 1922 publication of Emily Murphy's The Black Candle as the catalyst for the addition of the three extra drugs to a list of prohibited substances. Although Murphy's anti-drug screeds were widely read and helped spread the drug panic across the country, historian Catharine Carstairs disputes that the seven-page chapter "Marahuana – a new menace" inspired the inclusion of cannabis as a restricted substance.

Cannabis was made illegal when it was added to the country's Confidential Restricted List in 1923 under the Narcotics Drug Act Amendment Bill after a vague reference to a "new drug" during a late night session of the House of Commons on 23 April 1923. According to one government official, cannabis was outlawed after the Director of the Federal Division of Narcotic Control returned from League of Nations meetings where the international control of cannabis was broached. Cannabis did not begin to attract official attention in Canada until the later 1930s, and even then it was minimal. The first seizure of cannabis by Canadian police was not made until 1937. Commercial cultivation of industrial hemp was forbidden in 1938. Between 1946 and 1961, cannabis accounted for only 2% of all drug arrests in Canada.

In the 1960s, cannabis arrests began to increase rapidly in Canada. For the entire period of 1930–1946, the RCMP recorded only 25 cannabis arrests, but this rose to 2,300 cases in 1968, and to 12,000 cases in 1972. In response to the increased popularization of marijuana and the increase in criminal charges against middle class citizens, the government formed the Royal Commission of Inquiry into the Non-Medical Use of Drugs, usually referred to as the Le Dain Commission, in 1969 to investigate non-medical cannabis use in Canada. The commission's 1972 report recommended removing criminal penalties for cannabis possession, though not legalization, per se. While the subsequent two federal governments discussed the recommendation, no steps were actually taken to change legislation.

In 2001, the country started a medical marijuana program, managed by Health Canada. The program originally offered people access to home grown cannabis or sales directly from Health Canada. This was replaced with new regulations that set up a more traditional commercial sector for cannabis cultivation and distribution in 2013.

== Steps to legalization ==
=== Opioid crisis and medical use ===
In the 2010s opioid-related harms were reported as a public health issue in Canada. Health Canada notes for health care professionals that opioid-sparing effects of cannabinoids have been suggested in preclinical, case and observational studies while clinical trial results have been mixed.

Prospective studies and surveys have reported that some medical cannabis patients reduced or stopped opioids, including a prospective study of 115 patients reporting a reduction from 49.9 MME per day to 16.4 MME per day among continuers and a Canadian study of 1,145 patients reporting a decrease from 28% to 11% at six months and surveys reporting 35.3% and 48.6% of respondents substituting opioids. A BMJ Open systematic review found a mean reduction of −22.5 MME per day in observational studies with very low certainty and no clear difference in five randomized trials, and the U.S. Agency for Healthcare Research and Quality has rated the evidence for reduction in opioid use as insufficient. Cannabis is not an established treatment for opioid use disorder as a substitute for methadone or buprenorphine.

=== Cannabis activism ===
From the 1990s compassion clubs such as the Vancouver Compassion Club provided cannabis to patients with a physician diagnosis on a non-profit basis. Court decisions, including R v Beren and Swallow (2009 BCSC 429), influenced the medical framework, including the designated grower system and authorization of edible use. A June 2016 Nanos Research poll found seven in ten Canadians supported legalization.

In November 2012 Kelly Coulter and Andrea Matrosovs, then representing the women's alliance of the National Organization for the Reform of Marijuana Laws (NORML) in Canada, met with Trudeau in his parliamentary office to argue for legalization, a meeting that the Toronto Star later reported Trudeau and his advisers traced his shift toward supporting legalization to. NORML Canada Executive Director Jennawae Cavion has described this meeting as part of the organization's advocacy efforts.

=== Government initiative ===
In 2015, after he was elected Prime Minister, the first significant step that Justin Trudeau took was the creation of a federal-provincial-territorial task force to discuss a jointly suitable process for the legalization of cannabis possession for casual use. This Task Force on Marijuana Legalization and Regulation released a 106-page report to the public on 13 December 2016, with various recommendations. Those were provided for consideration by the federal and provincial governments, but they were not binding. Sales for recreational use were not to commence until 1 July 2018, at the earliest, based on legislation (Bill C-45, the Cannabis Act) passed by the federal government in June 2018.

The substance remains controlled: it is sold only at government licensed retailers, and grown only by licensed producers. During the federal election campaign, the Liberals had promised "new, stronger laws" against sales to minors, driving while impaired, and sales through channels not specifically authorized to do so.

Until 17 October 2018, cannabis remained illegal (except with a physician's prescription, for medical purposes), as Trudeau reminded police forces across the country in late 2016. He insisted that they "enforce the law": criminally charge illegal storefront dispensaries. Trudeau also explained that the intent of the legislation is not to encourage recreational use of cannabis. The intent is "to better protect our kids from the easy access they have right now to marijuana [and] to remove the criminal elements that were profiting from marijuana", he told the Toronto Star on 2 December 2016.

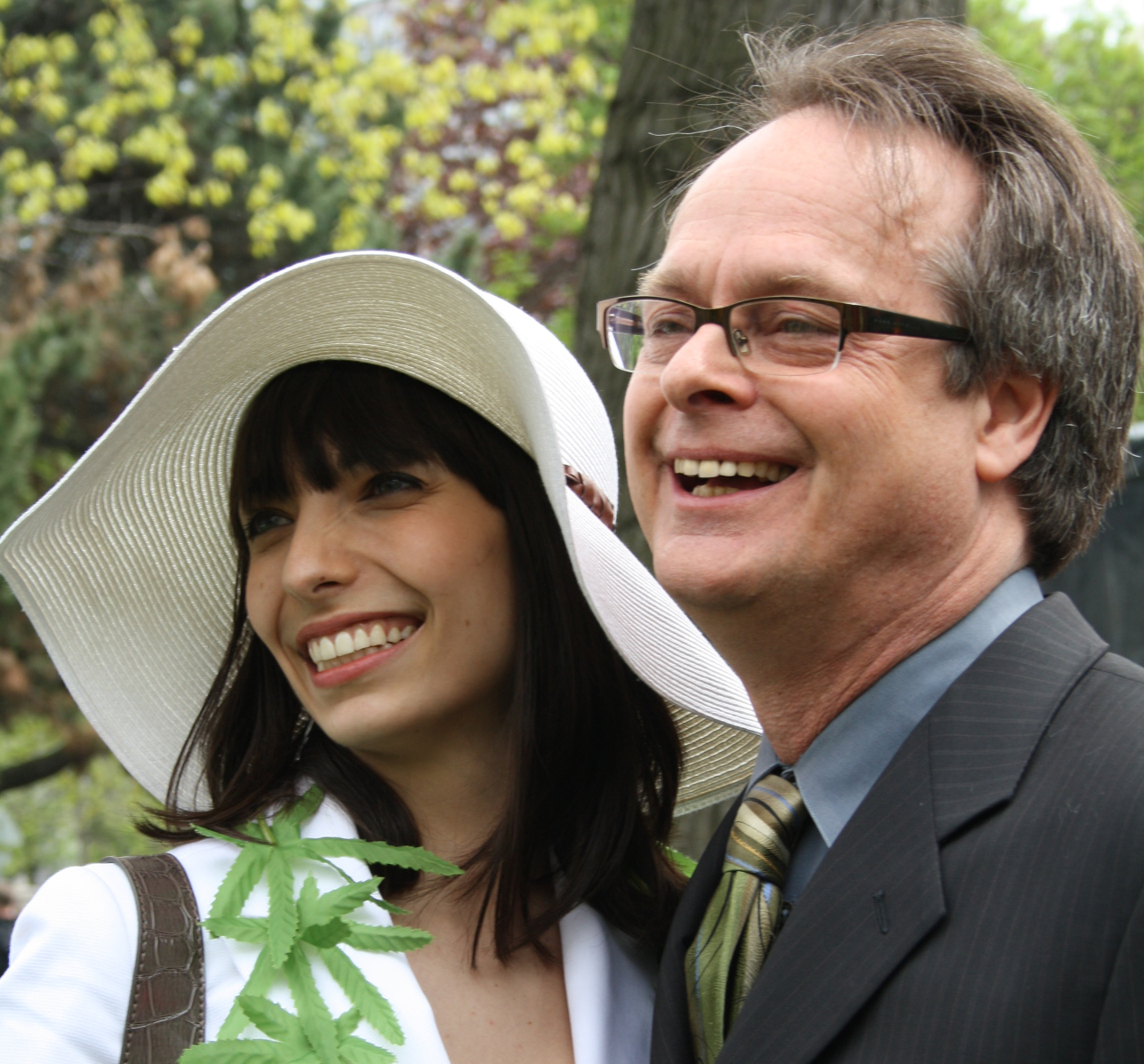
Marc and Jodie Emery, Canadian cannabis rights activists

Police forces took the Prime Minister seriously, and in March 2017, raided five locations of the Cannabis Culture retailer in Toronto, one in Vancouver, and another in Hamilton, Ontario. They also searched homes in Toronto, Stoney Creek, and Vancouver. Multiple charges were laid against Marc Emery and Jodie Emery, owners of Cannabis Culture, a company that franchised pot dispensary shops. The couple was convicted in December 2017 of drug-related charges, including possession of marijuana for the purpose of trafficking, fined, and placed on two years of probation. Drug-related charges were laid against three others who were also subsequently convicted.

Toronto Police had told the media that the unlicensed cannabis dispensaries are linked to "high-level drug traffickers [...] often tied to organized crime, given the amount of marijuana sold".

First Nations chiefs attending the Assembly of First Nations widely agreed that the distribution of cannabis on reserve lands should be governed by First Nations governments, and not provincial legislation.

Immediately after legalization, licensed growers often had difficulty accessing financial services. Alterna Savings and Alterna Bank were among the first financial institutions to make loans to businesses focusing on cannabis in Canada, providing primary banking services for approximately two-thirds of the hundred licensed growers in 2018.

=== Final legalization ===
Map showing which MPs voted in favour (green), against (red), abstained (grey) or whether the seat was vacant (black)

After the House of Commons passed Bill C-45, it was sent to the Senate. On 1 June 2018, the Senate passed an amendment to C-45 outlawing cannabis "brand-stretching". The amendment, which passed 34–28 in the Senate, would have outlawed the sale and display of cannabis-related merchandise once legalized. The amendment was rejected by the House of Commons.

On 19 June 2018, the Senate finally passed the bill, without the rejected amendment, and the Prime Minister announced the effective legalization date as 17 October 2018. Canada became the second nation (after Uruguay) to legalize the drug.

As expected, the use of cannabis for recreational purposes became legal across the country on 17 October 2018, under the Cannabis Act which "creates a legal and regulatory framework for controlling the production, distribution, sale and possession of cannabis in Canada", according to a Government of Canada web site. Persons aged 18 or older can possess up to 30 grams of dried or "equivalent non-dried form" in public. Adults are also allowed to make cannabis-infused food and drinks "as long as organic solvents are not used to create concentrated products". Each household is allowed to grow up to four cannabis plants from "licensed seed or seedlings", although Quebec and Manitoba chose to be excluded from this aspect of the legislation. There has been a legal challenge against Quebec's decision by a citizen who contested the ban on growing because the federal government allowed growing up to four plants per household. In June 2019 the Quebec Superior court agreed and declared once again in June 2019 that Quebecers could possess and grow as many as four plants. The Quebec government appealed that decision; it was declared by the Quebec Court of Appeal the previous decision was incorrect and that the province had the power to ban Quebecers from possessing and growing any cannabis plants with a simple fine imposed. Presently some Canadian lawyers are in the process of challenging the Manitoba ruling and following that will move on to challenge Quebec; this appears to be a joint effort between TOBA grown and NORML Canada.

As of May 1st, 2025, Canadians in Manitoba are allowed to have four plants per household.

Each province set its own procedures for retail sales. These vary as to ownership or retail outlets (by the provincial government or private enterprise), but all include an option for online sales. Since marijuana is illegal in the U.S. per federal legislation, the government warned that "previous use of cannabis, or any substance prohibited by U.S. federal laws, could mean that you are denied entry to the U.S." Canadians travelling within the country (but not internationally) are allowed to carry up to 30 grams of cannabis. Naturally, driving under the influence of drugs remained illegal. It was announced that on 1 May 2019, Canada would introduce excise tax on all products containing THC, and introduce three new product classes for recreational sale: cannabis edibles, cannabis extracts, and cannabis topicals.

On 17 October 2019, edibles were made legal in Canada, but with restrictions. The intent was to not allow any products that would be "appealing to young persons", probably including the colourful "gummies" candy which was popular on the black market. THC content in edibles is limited to 10 miligrams of THC per serving, an amount that the Competition Bureau has stated should be raised to fight the black market. NORML Canada has spread a petition calling for the limit to be raised to 100mg. A 100mg limit for edibles is supported by the Cannabis Council of Canada.

== Public opinion prior to legislation ==
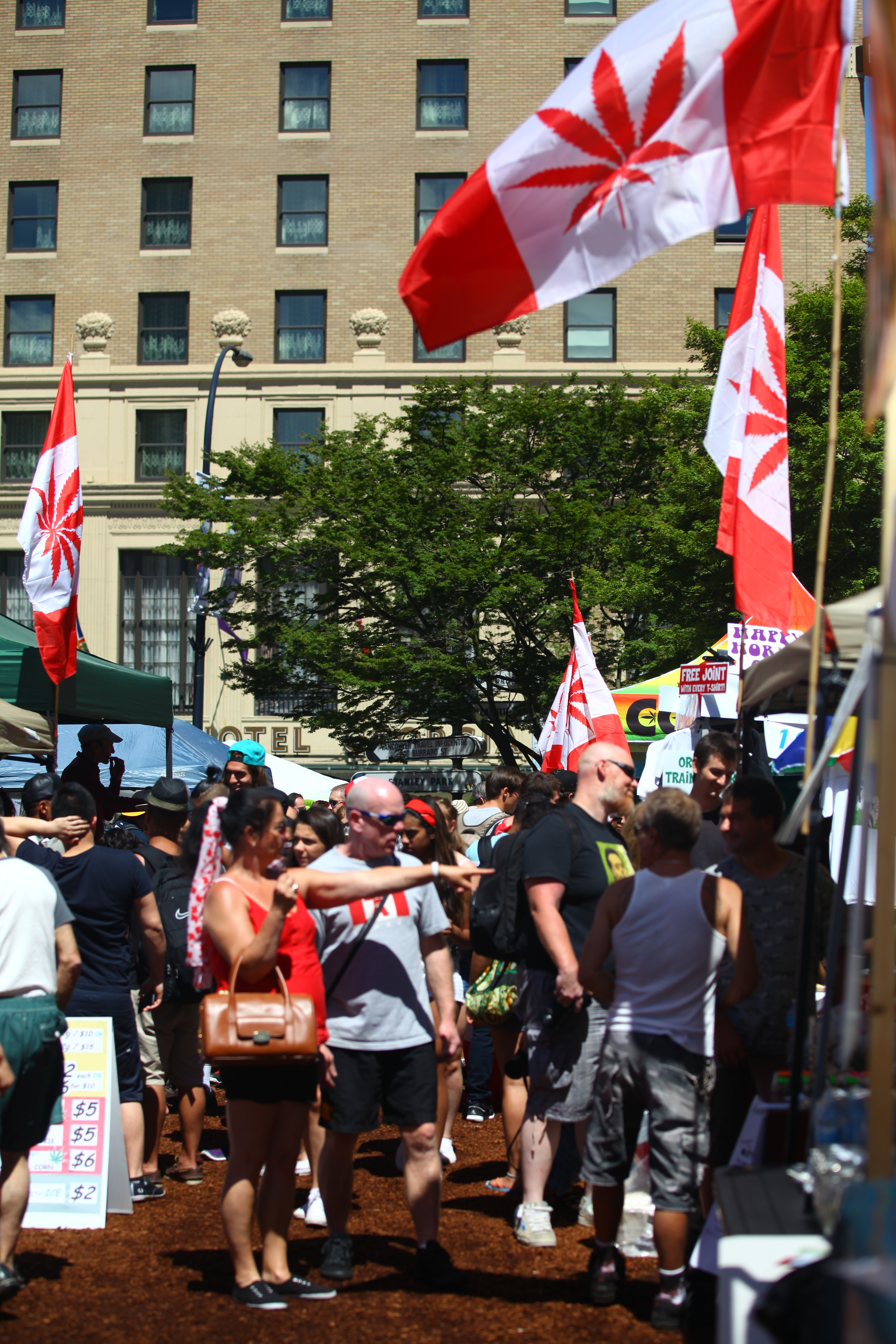
"Canada/Cannabis Day", 2014

Since 1997, public opinion polls have found an increasing majority of Canadians agree with the statement, "Smoking marijuana should not be a criminal offence". In June 2016, a national poll conducted by Nanos Research showed that 7 in 10 Canadians were in favour of legalization.

By 2006, a high percentage of the population was using cannabis, in spite of the risk of police charges for possession, and especially for selling it without the required licence, according to statistics gathered by the Centre for Addiction and Mental Health (CAMH). Nearly half (44%) of Canadians admit to trying it at least once; no statistics were provided as to the percentage who use it frequently. The CAMH report also indicates that by the last year of high school, nearly half (46%) of Ontario students admit to having used marijuana in the past year. The CAMH discussion includes warnings about the negative effects of cannabis. Other groups also warn about the risk, including the Canadian Automobile Association whose 2016 poll indicated, "Almost two-thirds of Canadians are concerned that roads will become more dangerous [due to impairment by the drug] with the legalization of marijuana". An October 2016 national poll by Forum suggests that about five million adult Canadians now use cannabis at least once a month; this is expected to increase by 19 percent after marijuana is legalized. Canaccord Genuity analysts Matt Bottomley and Neil Maruoka released a research note with a more moderate estimate of the number of users. They predicted that approximately 3.8 million persons will be recreational users (presumably on a frequent basis) by 2021. A report by Canada's Parliamentary Budget Officer (PBO) is more bullish, estimating that by 2021 some 5.2 million adults may be users. The Canadian government's Canadian Cannabis Survey 2021 found that 17% of Canadians aged 16 and older reported using cannabis in the last 30 days.

== Cannabis as a commodity ==
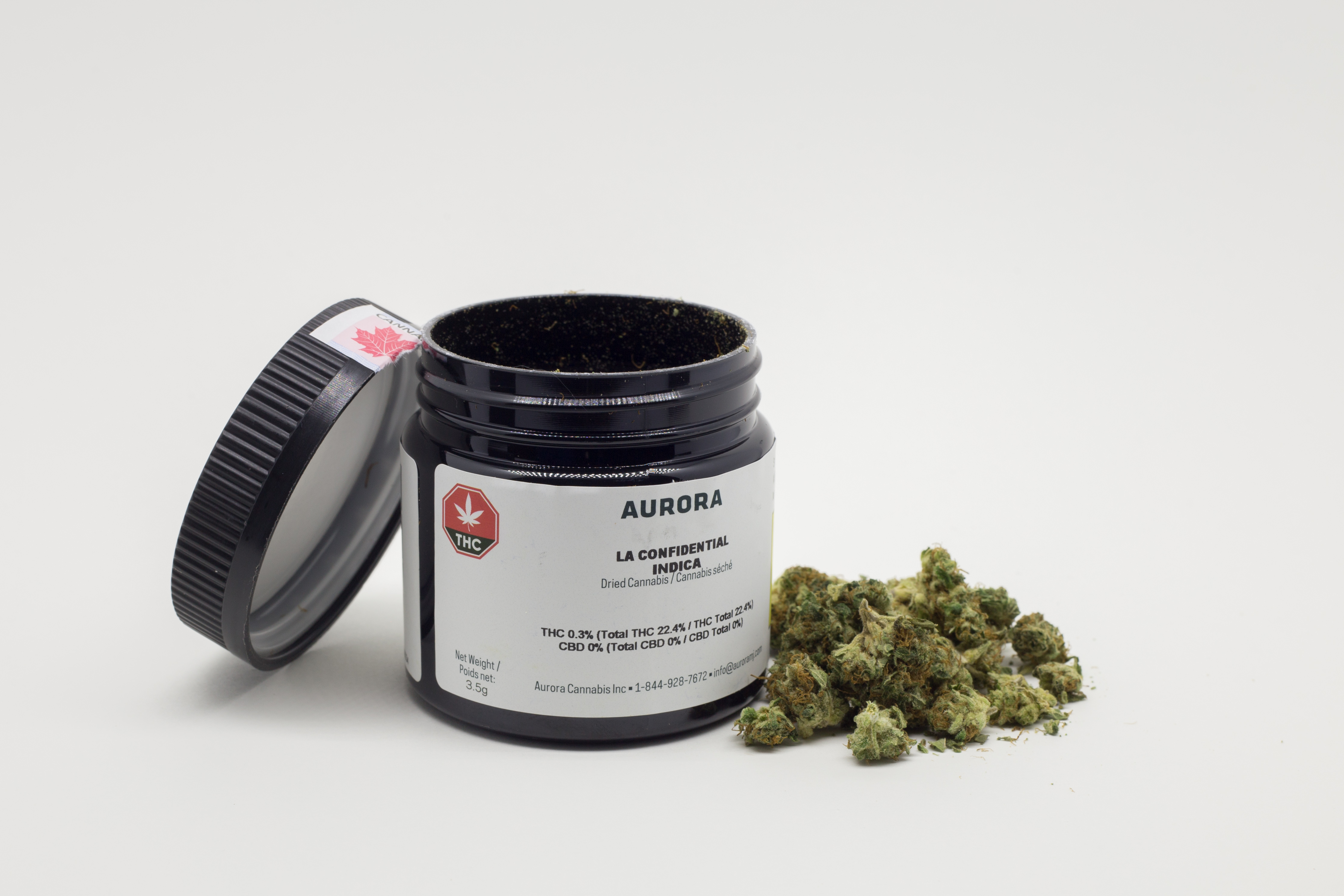
Example of a container and the recreational cannabis purchase in Canada

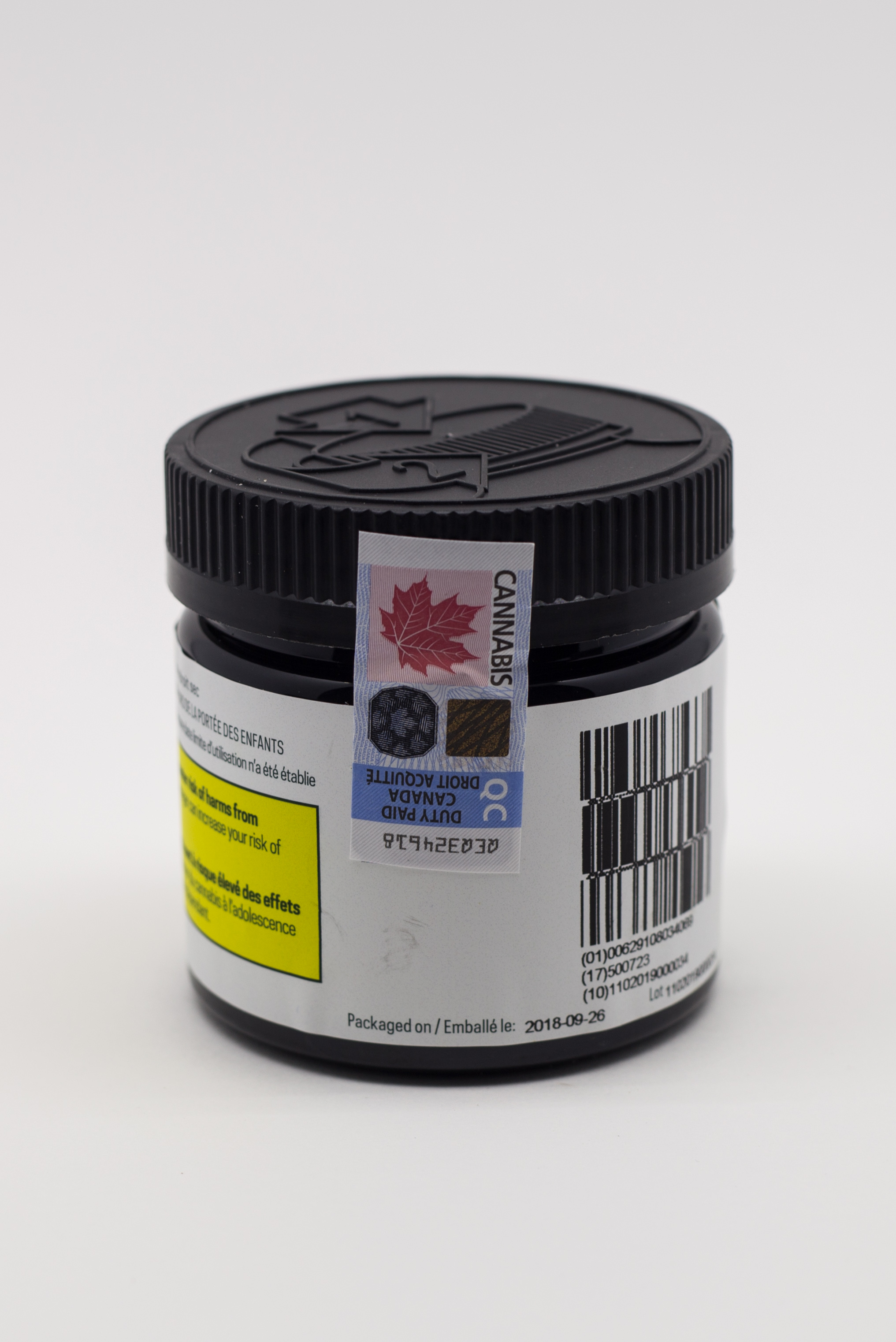
Mandatory cannabis excise stamp on recreational cannabis sold in Canada

Growers that currently produce marijuana are licensed by Health Canada under the Access to Cannabis for Medical Purposes Regulations (ACMPR). As of late 2016, there were 36 authorized producers across the country in Health Canada's list. Sales were allowed only by mail order, but by late 2017, some major retailers had applied for a change in the rules to allow them to also sell the product. By 21 December 2017, 82 licences had been issued under the ACMPR, but not all of the producers had been licensed to begin selling medical marijuana. The vast majority of these companies were located in Ontario. At that time, no licences had been issued yet for producing recreational cannabis; the producers already licensed were hoping to be added to that list after it is created. Between 1 February and early April 2018, some 89 additional applicants were approved as cannabis growers by Health Canada; at the time, the agency was considering the merits of another 244 applications.

Statistics indicate that, as of September 2016, nearly 100,000 Canadians had bought medical marijuana legally, a significant increase over the 30,537 in September 2015, presumably since it is becoming a mainstream drug and since supplies are becoming more readily available. According to a StatsCan estimate, Canadians may have spent roughly CAD$6.2 billion (US$4.8 billion) on marijuana in 2015, although the agency admits that there is no scientific method of accurately measuring illegal consumption.

The report by the Task Force on Marijuana Legalization and Regulation had recommended that recreational cannabis growers should be licensed at a federal level, separately from the producers of medical marijuana. The expert panel also recommended that the process ensure competition by licensing both large and small producers. While licensing should be federal, each of the provinces should be allowed to determine how and where the product will be sold.

After the plans for legalization became well-publicized, industry analysts reported that some of the producers who had been licensed for medical marijuana, including Aurora Cannabis, were already increasing the capacity of their operations for future sales to the distributors of recreational cannabis.

A report in late November 2017 by Ernst & Young suggested that there would be mergers, leaving fewer players in this industry. "Many believe that consolidation is inevitable, leaving a few large players post-legalization." Also in late 2017, Deloitte predicted that the recreational cannabis market would be worth close to $23 billion. Lately, US Alcohol companies have been showing interest in the Cannabis business in Canada. US Cannabis producers are afraid that Canada is going to be the prime dominator in the market.

On 17 October 2019, alternative cannabis products such as drinks, edibles, and topicals became legal for production, and were expected to be available for sale two months later. Deloitte has predicted that the alternative cannabis product market will be worth close to $2.7 billion.

Due to illegality of cannabis federally in the United States, crossing the international border from Canada into the United States while carrying cannabis is still illegal. Past consumption of cannabis can also lead to a permanent ban on entry to the U.S.

As of 2023, the legalization of cannabis has helped to create 151,000 jobs in Canada since its legalization in 2018.

As of December 2024, fewer people operated a vehicle after cannabis use in the past 12 months when compared to 2018. "18% of people who consumed cannabis in the past 12 months reported driving after cannabis use, a decrease from 27% in 2018 but an increase from 15% in 2023."

=== 2019 sales volume ===
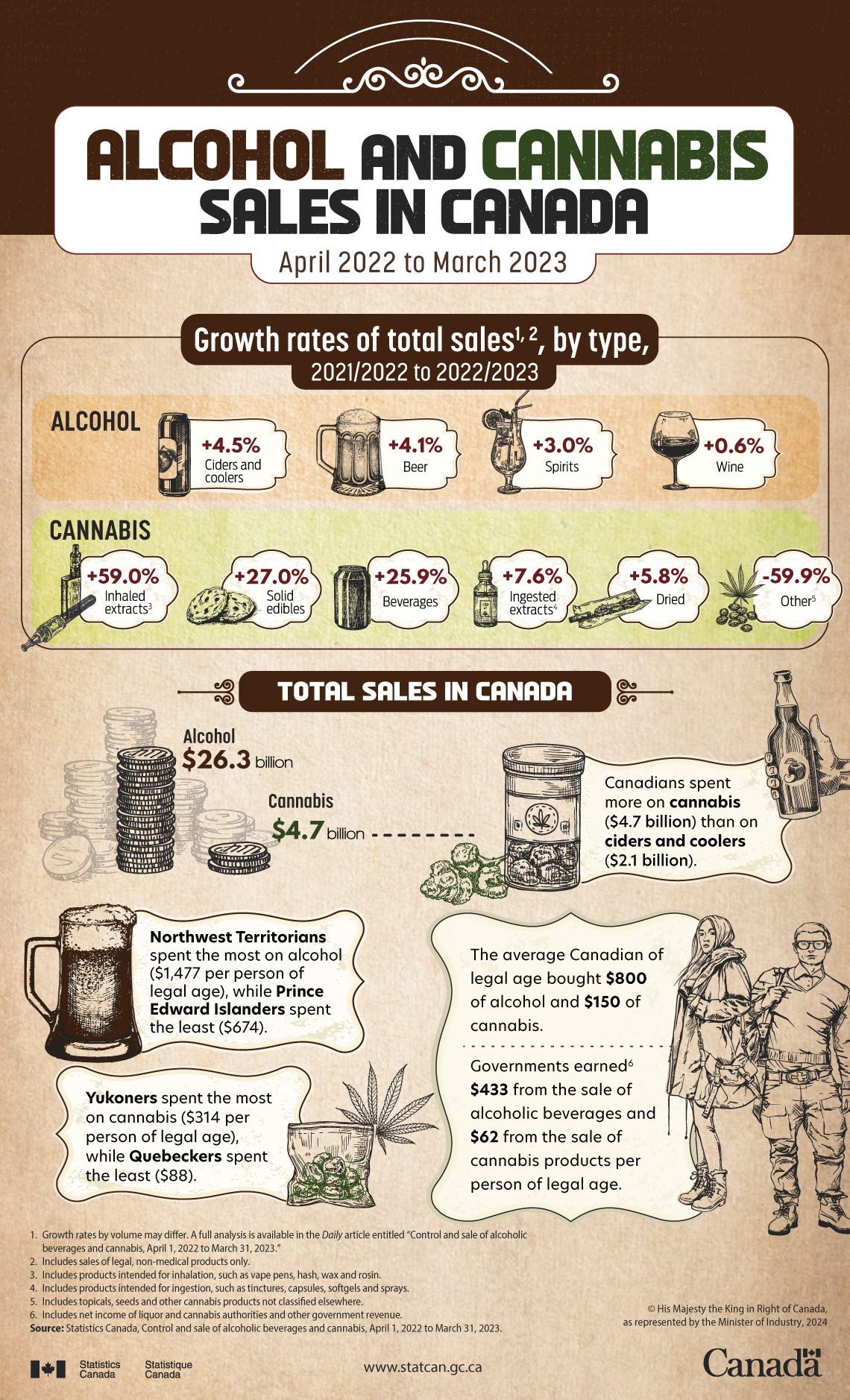
Alcohol and cannabis sales in Canada, April 2022 to March 2023

An October 2019 report stated that total cannabis sales for the first seven months of the year were only C$524 million when C$4.34 billion (US$3.29 billion) was forecast a year ago. Sales were modest because of the limited number of retail operations in Ontario and Quebec where some 23 million people resided; each province had only 25 outlets, as of October 2019. The relatively high cost of the legal product – almost double that of the black market – and the limited types of product (dried flower and oils) also worked against retail sales. In late 2019, more stores were being opened and a wider range of legal cannabis was becoming available, including edibles, topicals, and vaping products.

Profitability was a problem however, according to a report in early November 2019 which stated, "pot stocks down nearly 60 per cent since March highs". This was leading companies to sell off real estate holdings as a method of raising capital to finance expansion.

=== Competing with the black market ===
A report in October 2019 by Bloomberg News painted a bleak picture of the legal cannabis industry. Because of the relatively few retail outlets, especially in Ontario, and the high retail prices, the black market remained persistent. An independent cannabis research firm estimated that the black market accounted for 86% of cannabis sales. On average, on a Canada-wide basis, legal cannabis was selling for about $10.23 per gram versus $5.59 found on the black market according to StatsCan. The province of Ontario took steps in 2020 to increase the number of retail licenses issued per month to increase the availability of legal cannabis, in order to combat the illicit market. The market share of legal cannabis products has since risen rapidly, with a Statistics Canada analysis suggesting that Canadians were spending more on legal than illegal cannabis products by the third quarter of 2020, with the amount spent in the black market having dropped by nearly half since immediately prior to legalization. In response to Statistics Canada's 2021 Canadian Cannabis Survey, 64% of cannabis users reported that they usually purchased cannabis from a legal storefront or online store, up from 54% in 2020 and 37% in 2019. Legal market capture of cannabis in Canada after 5 years of legalization was approximately 78%.

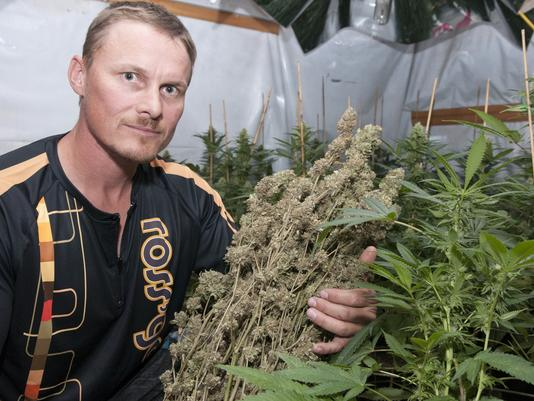
Canadian Olympic gold medalist Ross Rebagliati is an entrepreneur in the cannabis industry.

=== Craft cannabis ===
Under the Cannabis Act passed in 2018, only producers licensed by the government are allowed to grow the product. As of early October 2018, there were at least 117 such licensed producers.

Although consolidation of the cannabis market in Canada is expected to the point where "a handful of companies will control the majority of the market", many claim that there is an important need for smaller craft cannabis producers that are "more able to adapt to consumer demand". The craft cannabis industry has been compared to the craft beer industry – smaller producers who are able to experiment more and provide a wider variety to the larger companies, which will likely try to please as many consumers as possible. However, the difference is that the relatively new rise of craft brewers in a mature market is different than craft cannabis starting at the same time as larger producers (for recreational cannabis). This will give larger producers the edge in the short term since those companies have more money.

The expected buy-in for craft cannabis producers is perhaps slightly higher than craft brewers, but there are other barriers to launching a craft cannabis company including the ability to market product. Cannabis marketing will be closer to tobacco marketing (which is prohibited in Canada with few limited exceptions) cannabis will be sold in plain packaging and traditional advertising such as TV commercials will be prohibited. They will likely not even be able to mention things that could be important to the consumer such as where it's grown (i.e., "buy local") and if it's organic.

Further, simply selling their product may be difficult. The supply chain is still not entirely clear as it is in the beer industry, but there are ways for craft cannabis producers to sell their product through selling to other micro-processors – and potentially larger producers – or applying for a micro-processing licence themselves. As of the legalization date, consumers cannot sample or purchase product directly from a craft cannabis producer's storefront as you can with craft beer or buy cannabis from a stall on the side of the road as you might from a farmer. However, British Columbia's Public Safety Minister Mike Farnsworth said that the province wouldn't rule out farmers selling direct to consumer.

Still, most craft cannabis producers are optimistic. One craft cannabis producer told The Globe and Mail that "I think there is a real opportunity there for small independents." Craft cannabis producers are seen by some as the "artisans of the industry" who will experiment with strains, increase variety, and produce a quality product that it can sell at a premium.

==== Excise tax and sales tax ====
From the early planning stages, the government indicated that the substance would be taxed. An estimate in late 2016 suggested revenues of $618 million per year from a federal tax initially, and eventually, billions, according to a report by Canada's Parliamentary Budget Officer (PBO). (A recent government estimate indicates that the illegal marijuana industry is worth $7 billion per year.) The Task Force report recommended that high-potency cannabis (with a high THC content) be taxed at a higher level than the conventional product to make it less attractive to consumers.

The federal government had announced in October 2017 that its budget would include $546 million over five years to prepare the "legal framework to strictly regulate and restrict access to cannabis" and another $150 million over six years to enforce the restrictions on drug-impaired driving. Health Canada and the Royal Canadian Mounted Police will receive a share of the funds. Of this amount, municipal and indigenous police services should receive $81 million to offset the increased cost of training and resources.

On 10 November 2017, the government announced that the federal excise tax, to be shared 50/50 with the provinces and territories, should not exceed $1 a gram or 10 per cent of the producer's price, whichever is higher. The government's press released did not specify higher tax on high-potency products. In December 2017, after demands from provinces for a higher percentage, a two-year agreement was signed to provide a full 75% of the tax; as well, the maximum to be taken by the federal government would be $100 million per annum, with any excess paid to the provinces and territories. The final retail price of the product will include provincial sales tax, ranging from 5% to 15% depending on the province. This arrangement will be discussed again in December 2018 to determine whether the five months of experience indicated that the 75/25 tax splitting scheme had proved to be appropriate.

From October 2018, when cannabis was legalized, to August 31, 2025, the total tax revenue from cannabis products was over $5.4 billion. The federal government collected $1.2 billion while the provinces and territories collected $4.2 billion. This tax revenue does not include the province of Manitoba, due to the province not taking part in the federally managed cannabis taxation framework.

== Regulation by province ==
Map of age of legal cannabis use per province Minimum age is 21 Minimum age is 19 Minimum age is 18

In Canada, regulation varies province to province, though there are some general rules regarding promotion, packaging, and advertising. Adult-use cannabis can only be sold in packages of a single colour without graphics other than the logo and a health warning. Cannabis companies in Canada will not be allowed to promote themselves through TV commercials, billboards, or glossy magazine ads, sponsor people or events, or put their names on sports and cultural facilities. To address these advertising challenges, some brands are connecting with popular media influencers like Gene Simmons and the Trailer Park Boys.

The Cannabis Act (2018) gave provinces the power to determine the method of distribution and sale and whether cannabis use will be legal inside private residence or homes if children are present in the home 12 or more hours in a day, and each will also establish the legal age for cannabis use. An excise tax will be levied, to be shared with the provinces and territories. According to the federal government, estimated annual sales will be $4 billion (US$3.2b).

The Cannabis Act (2018) also allows householders to grow up to four cannabis plants, but Quebec and Manitoba announced that they would not permit this option. New Brunswick is specifying indoor growing only in a separate locked space, but will also allow outdoor growing for plants that are up to 1.52m (5 feet) high.

The minimum age to purchase and consume cannabis in most of Canada is 19 years old with the only exceptions being Alberta which has it at 18 years old and Quebec where it is 21 years old (the highest in the country). Manitoba and Quebec are currently the only provinces or territories where the legal cannabis age is higher than the alcohol and tobacco purchase age (19 for cannabis in Manitoba and 21 in Quebec vs. 18 for alcohol/tobacco in both provinces). In Prince Edward Island, the cannabis purchase age (19) is lower than the tobacco purchase age (21).

Under the newly elected Coalition Avenir Québec government, the Deputy Minister for Health in October 2018, Lionel Carmant announced that the Government will tighten the rules on cannabis consumption, including increasing the legal age to consume to 21 from 18. In 2019, CAQ announced Quebec will also ban the sale of cannabis candies and desserts, including chocolate, because federal cannabis regulations don't go far enough in protecting children from accidentally consuming the drug. However, as recently as 2022, the SQDC (Quebec) has marketed an edible two-pack of 2.5mg THC and 5mg CBD per piece.

== Military ==
In early September 2018, the Canadian government released a directive stating that service members will be allowed to use cannabis following legalization in October, but with restrictions on use depending on the individual's duties. Per the new regulations, service members may use legal cannabis, but must cease usage:

- 8 hours prior to duty: all personnel
- 24 hours prior to duty: anyone operating a weapon or vehicle
- 28 days before duty: members involved in high-risk activities such as high-altitude parachuting, operating in a hyperbaric environment such as diving or submarine service, and serving on military aircraft on international operations

== Gallery ==
=== Cannabis store exteriors ===
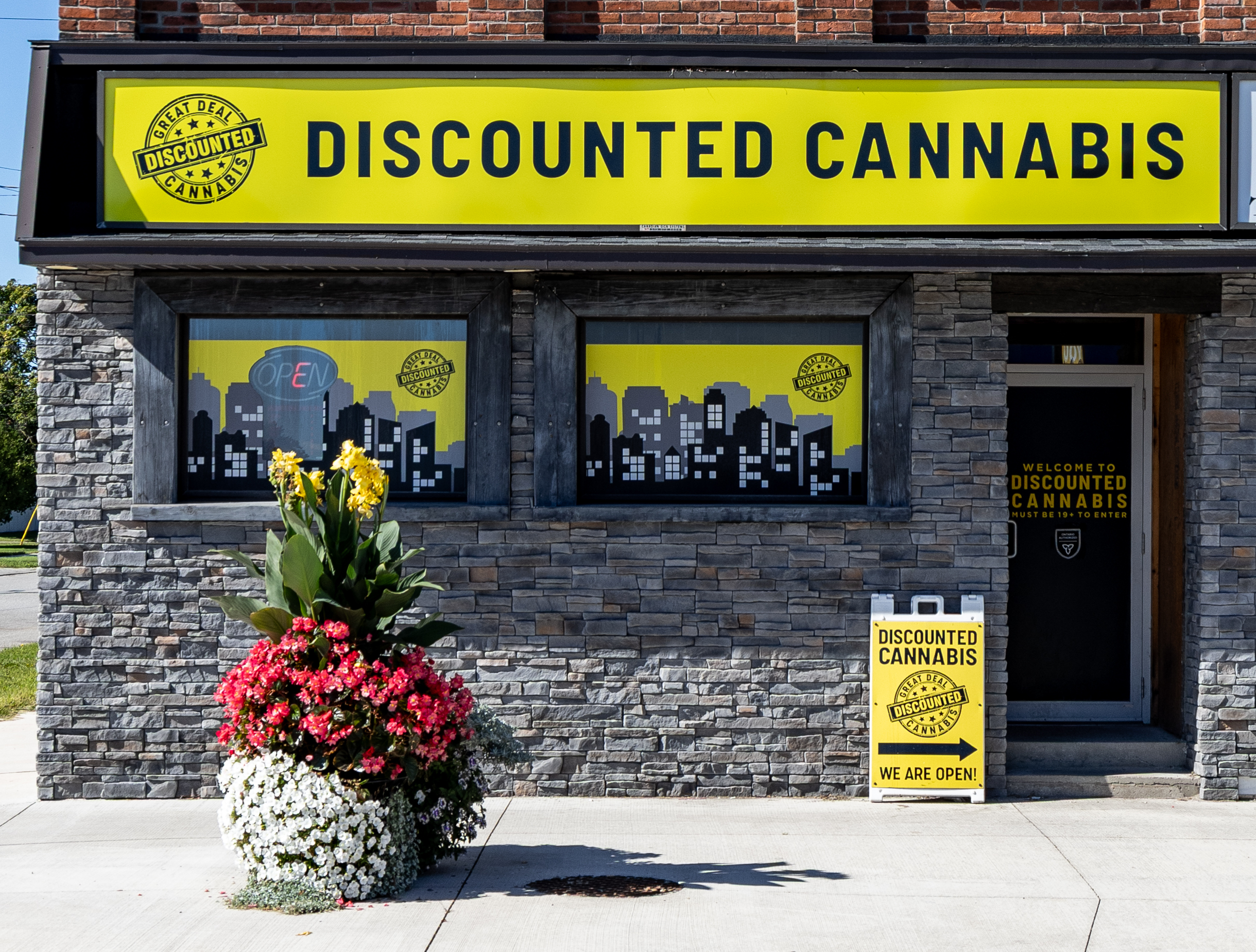

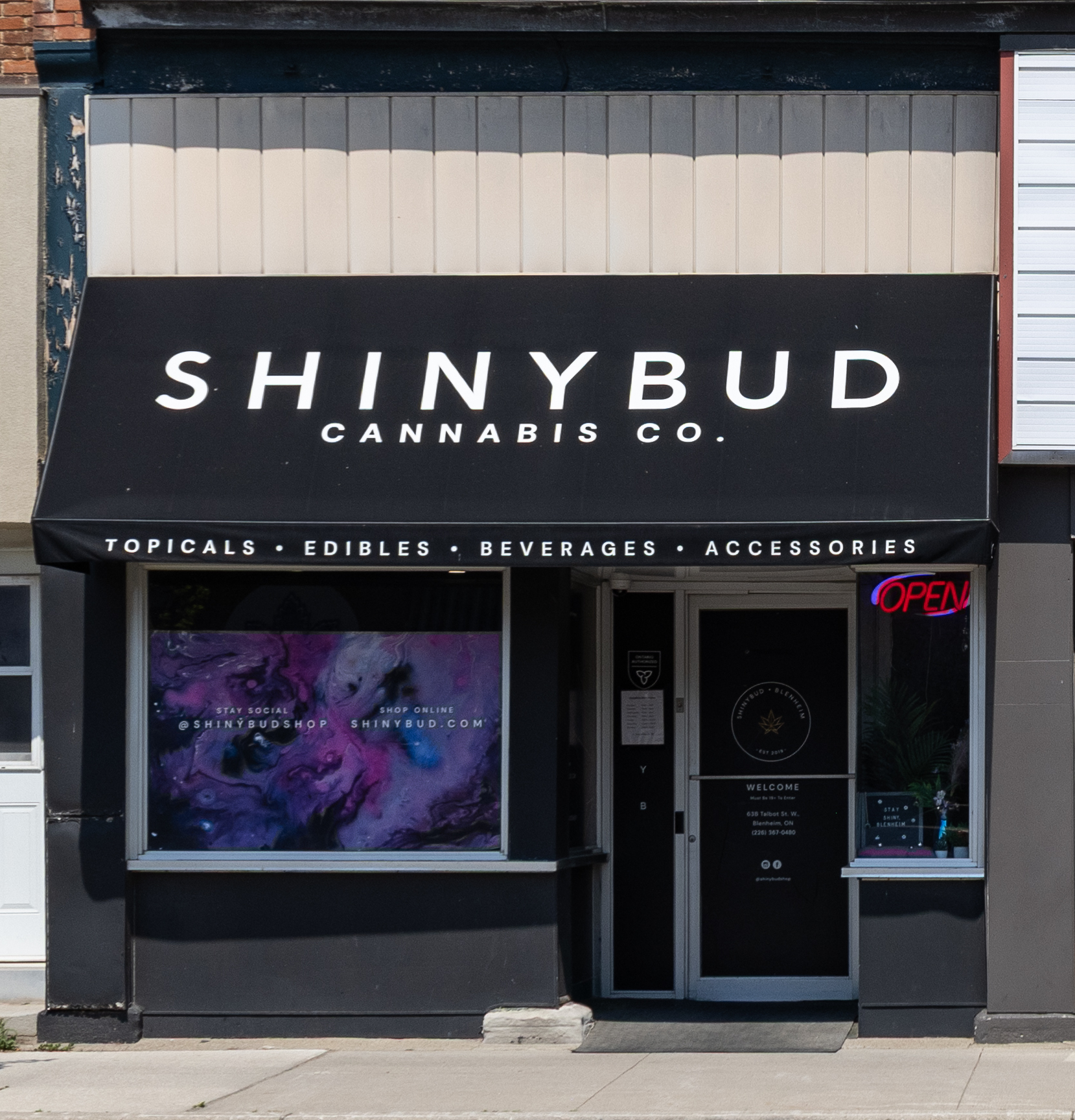

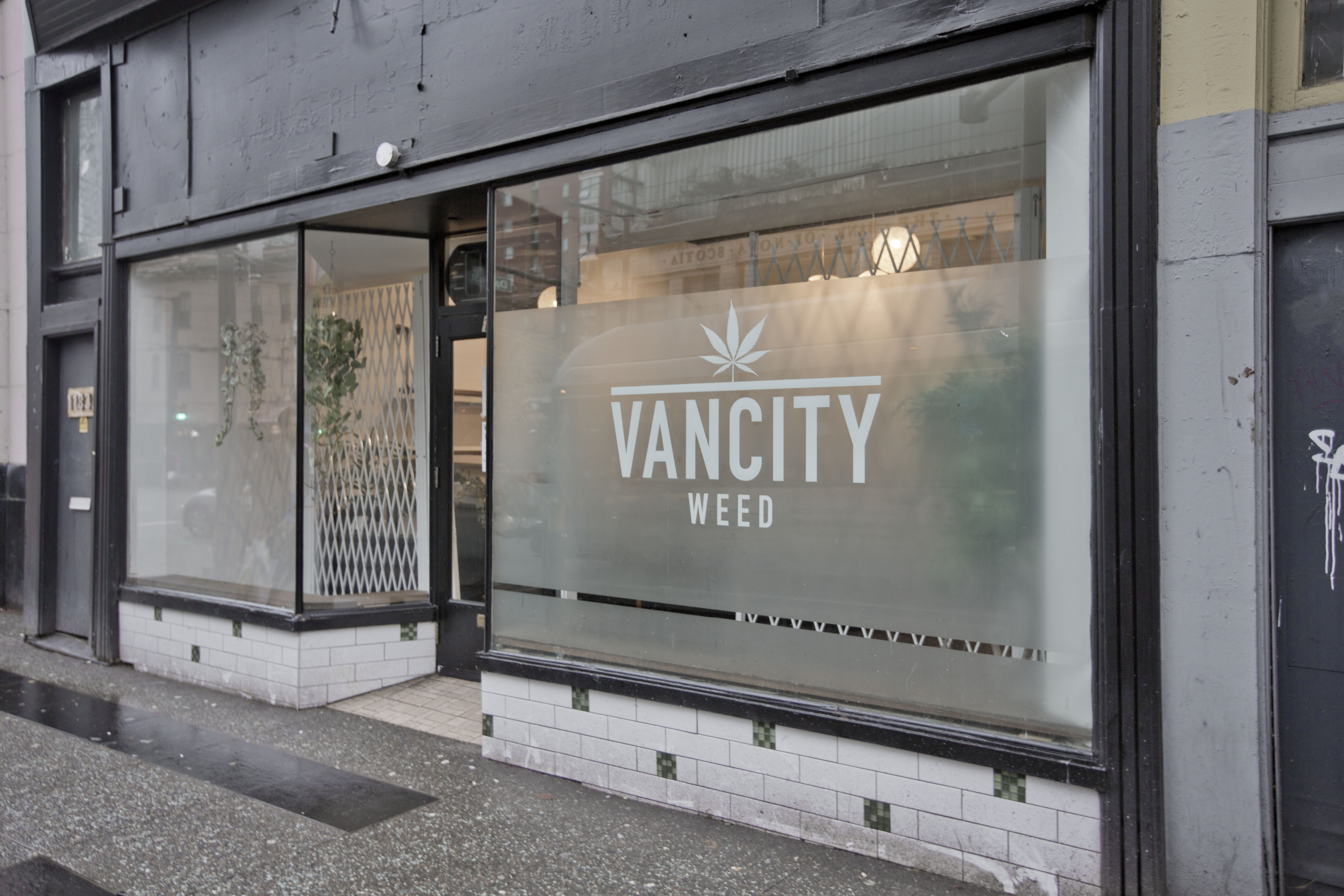

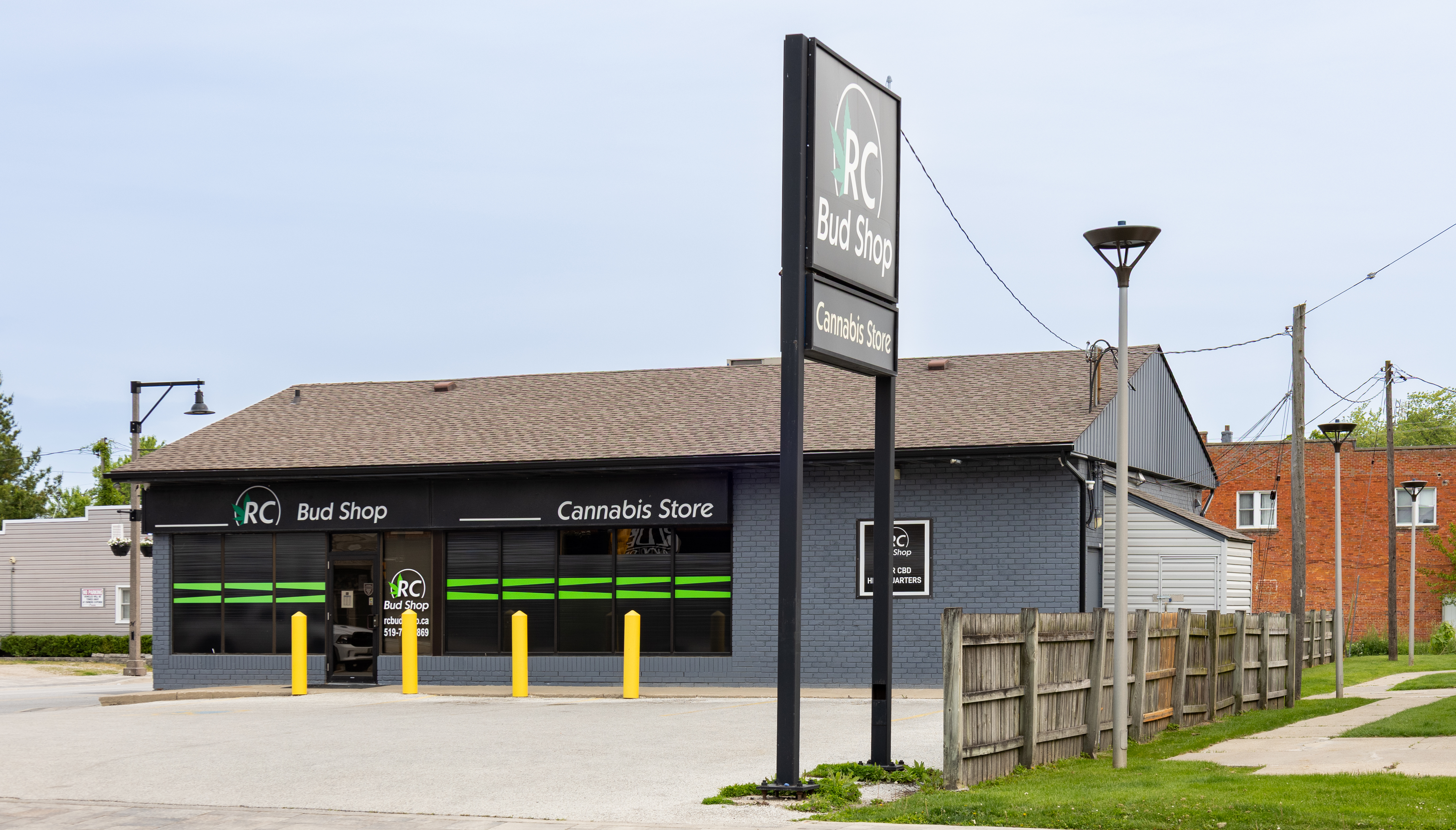

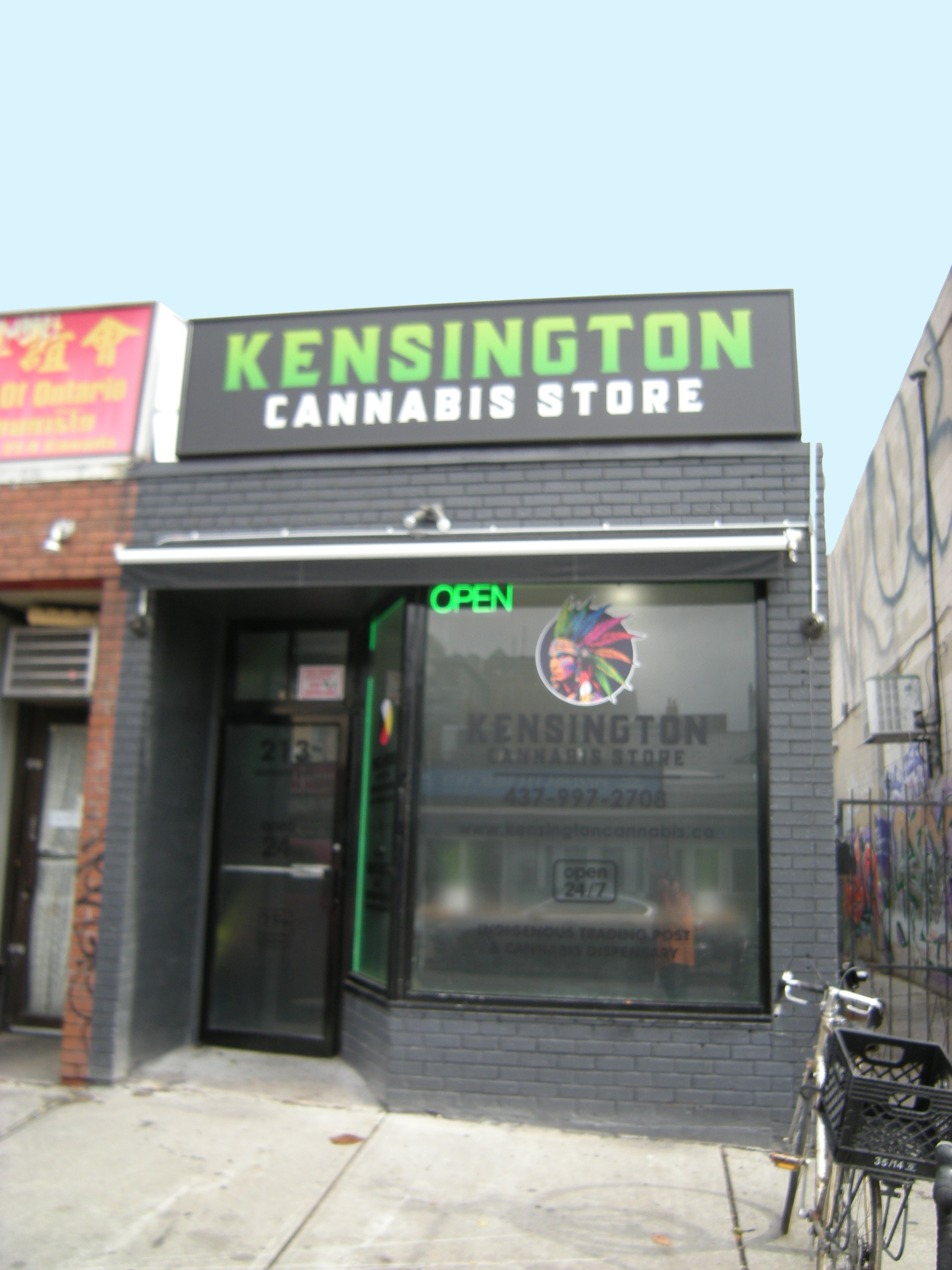

=== Cannabis store interiors ===
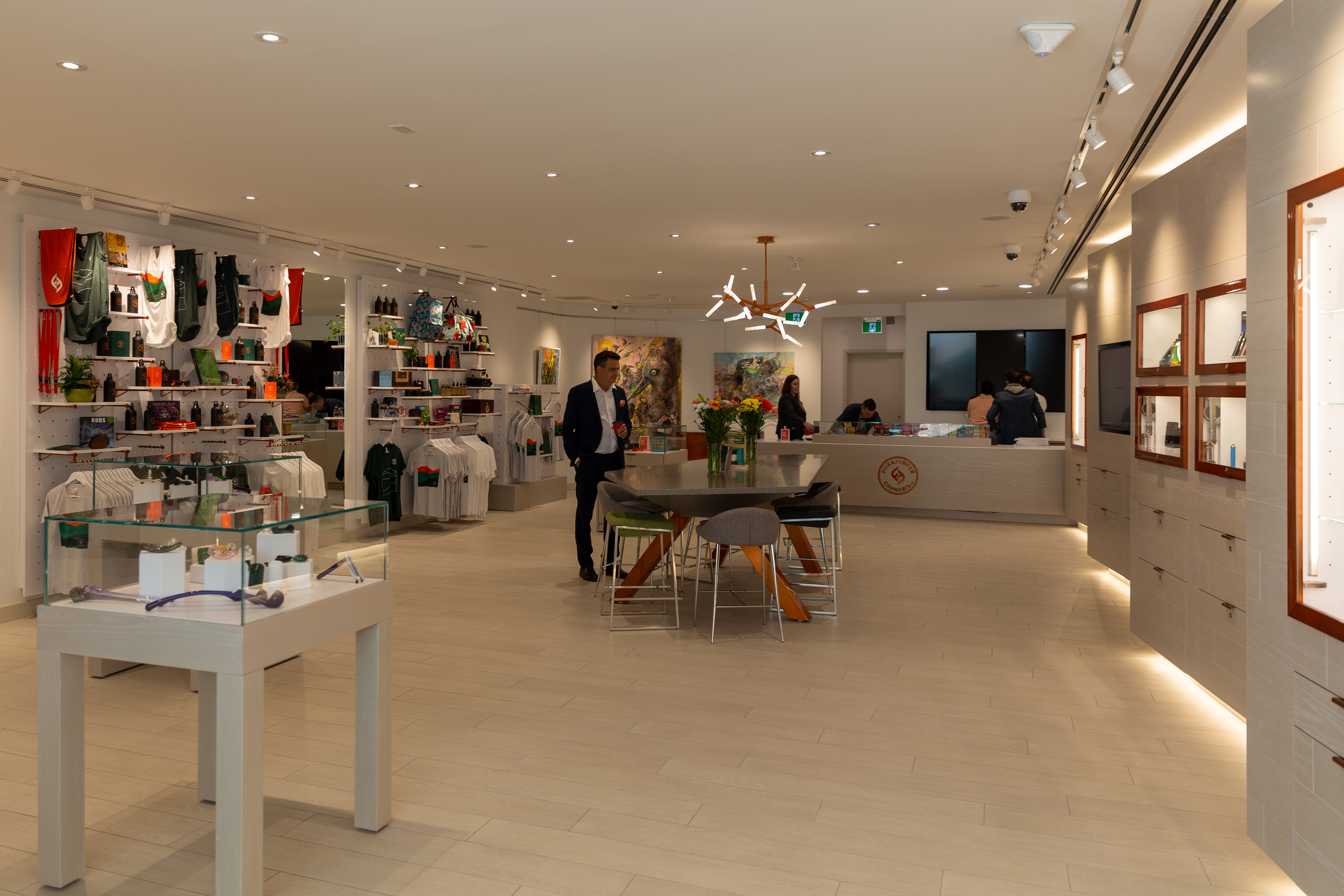

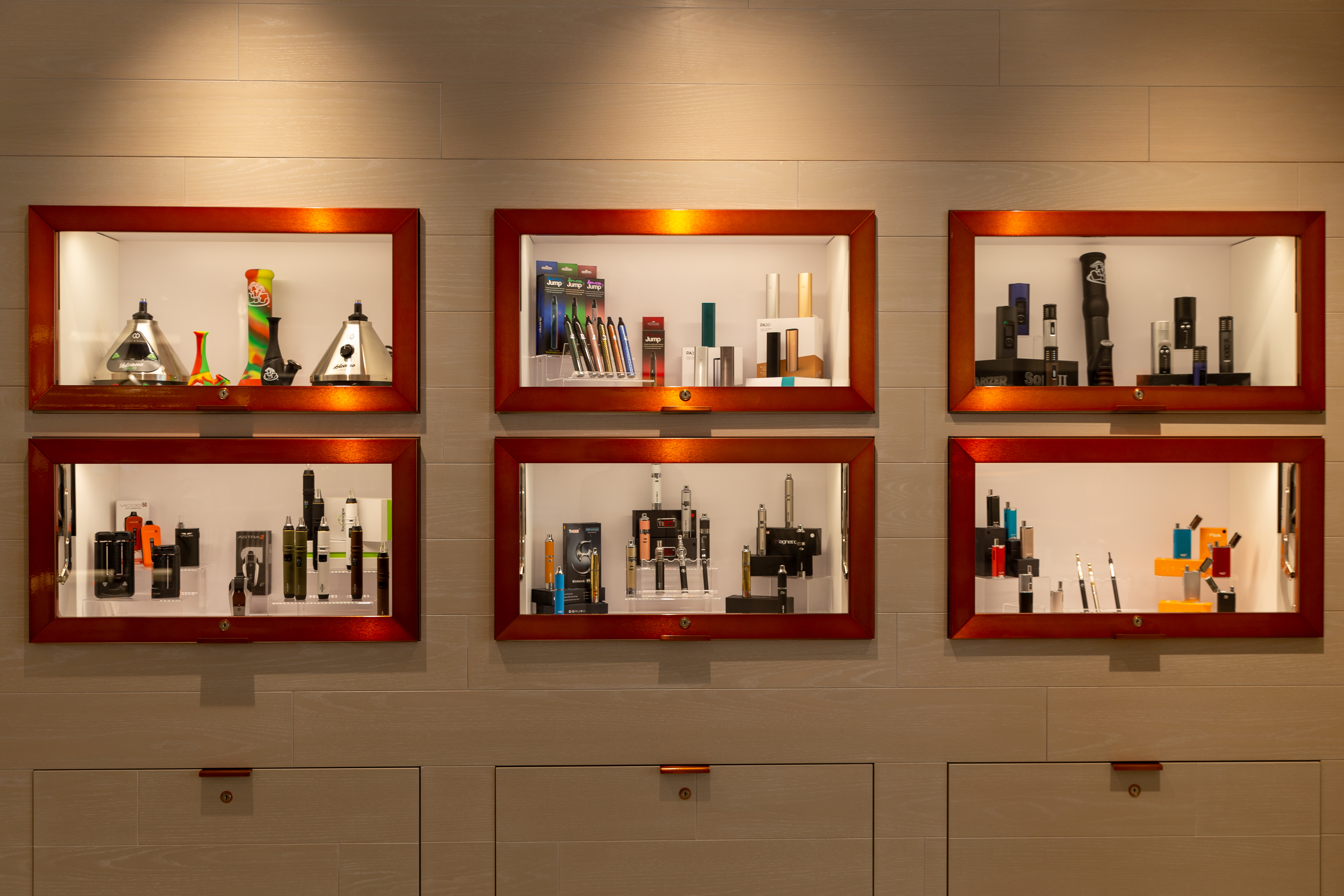

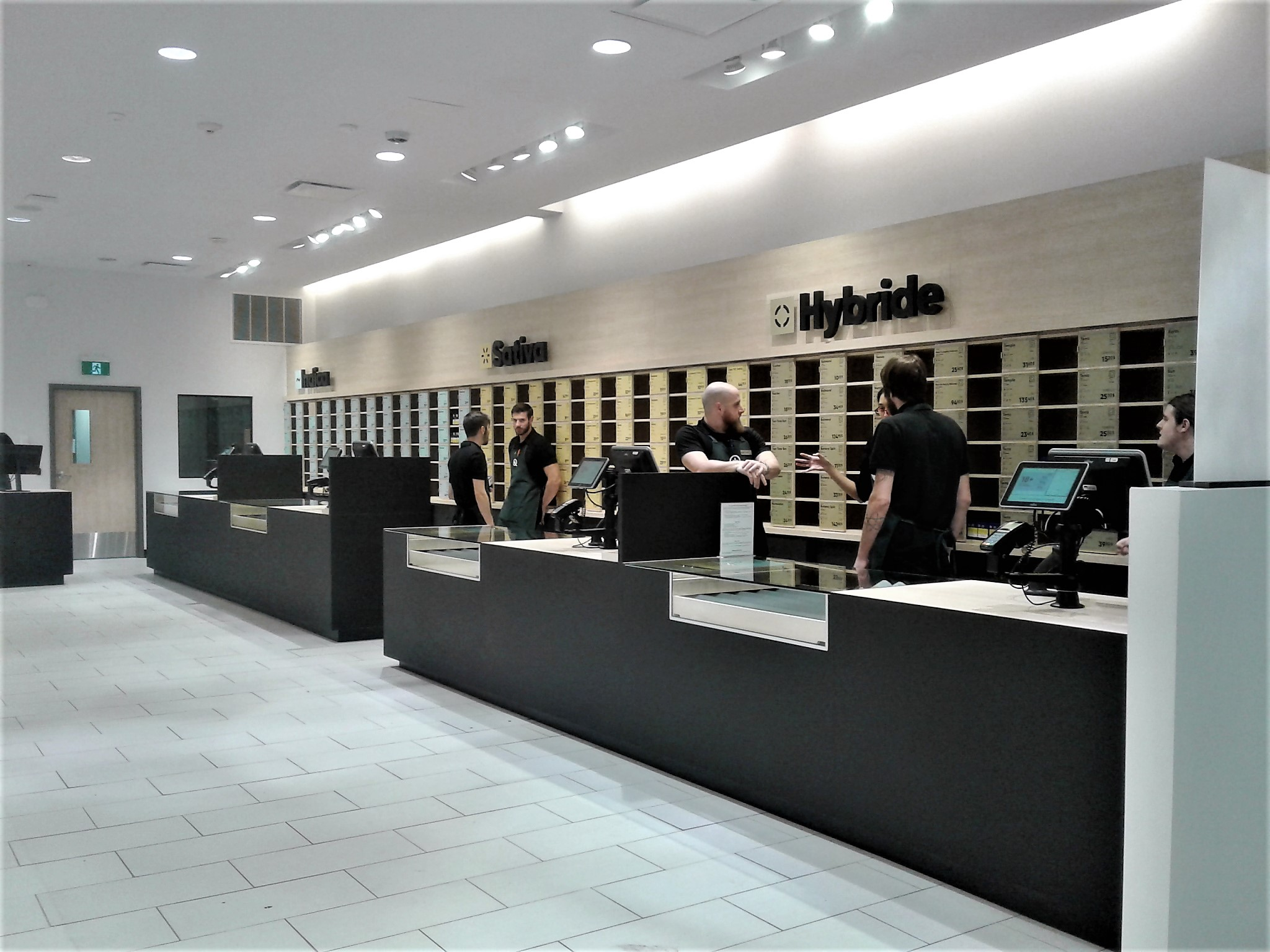

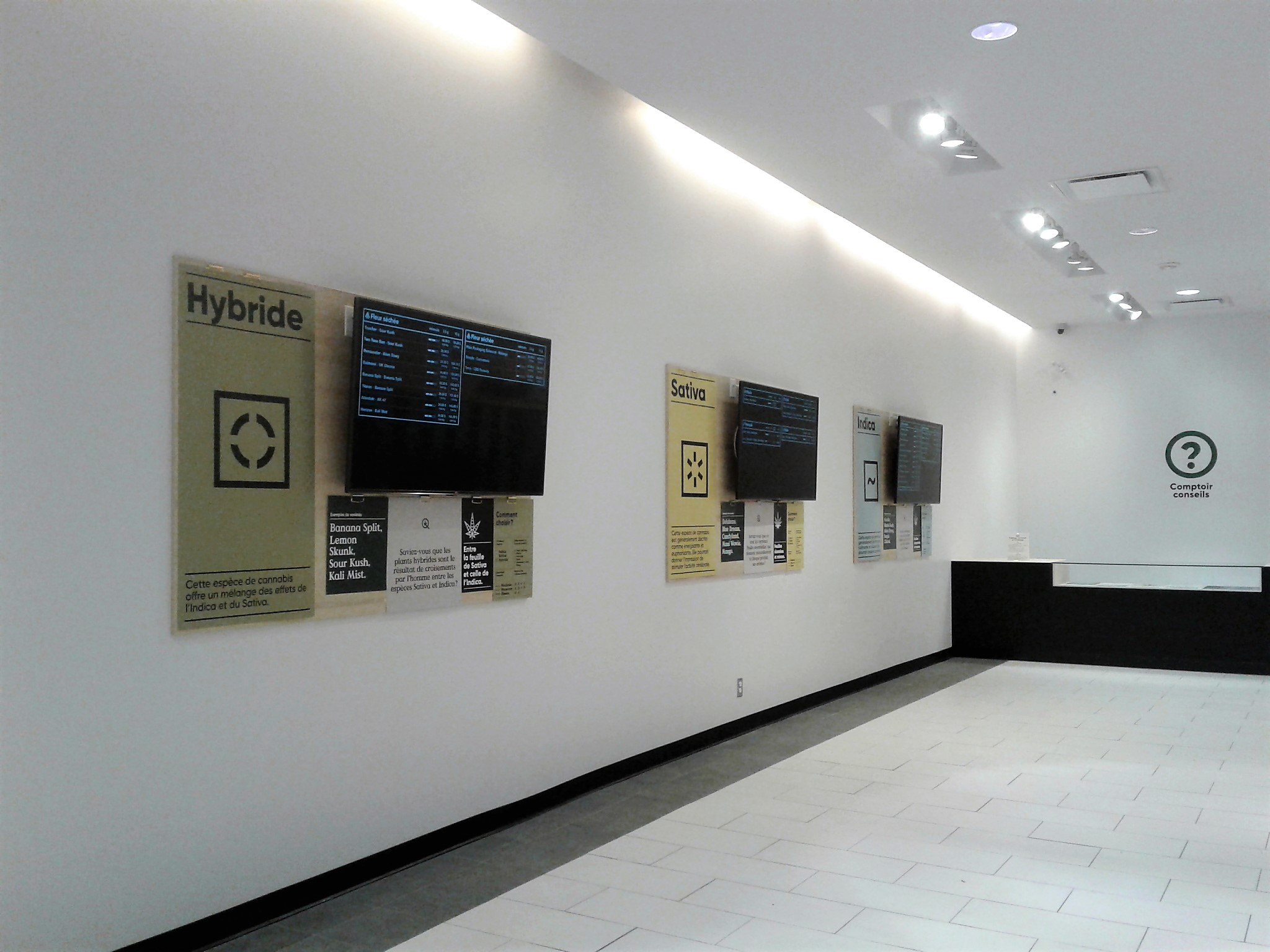

== See also ==
- Cannabis laws of Canada by province or territory
- By province or territory
- Cannabis in Alberta
- Cannabis in British Columbia
- Cannabis in Manitoba
- Cannabis in New Brunswick
- Cannabis in Newfoundland and Labrador
- Cannabis in the Northwest Territories
- Cannabis in Nova Scotia
- Cannabis in Nunavut
- Cannabis in Ontario
- Cannabis in Prince Edward Island
- Cannabis in Quebec
- Cannabis in Saskatchewan
- Cannabis in Yukon
- Cannabis on Canadian Indian reserves
- Marijuana Party (Canada)
