= Cannabis in Nunavut =

Map of age of legal cannabis use per province Minimum age is 21 Minimum age is 19 Minimum age is 18

Cannabis in Nunavut, as in the rest of Canada, became legal for recreational use on the effective date of the Cannabis Act on 17 October 2018.

Cannabis in Canada has been legal for medicinal purposes since 2001 under conditions outlined in the Marihuana for Medical Purposes Regulations, later superseded by the Access to Cannabis for Medical Purposes Regulations, issued by Health Canada and seed, grain, and fibre production was permitted under licence by Health Canada.

The federal Cannabis Act, legalizing cannabis for recreational use, came into effect on 17 October 2018. Each province and territory set its own laws for various aspects, such as the legal age, whether householders can grow cannabis and the method of retail sales.

== 2017 Cannabis legalization survey ==
In August and September 2017, Nunavut residents aged 16 and older were encouraged to complete a brief online survey with their opinions on the upcoming legalization of cannabis. The results were released in December 2017, based on the feedback of 1,148 respondents. Among the survey's findings:

- 75% of respondents supported legalizing cannabis, with 19% opposed and 6% no opinion
- Nearly three-quarters of respondents wanted restrictions on where cannabis can be smoked, but fewer than half wanted restrictions on where non-smoked products could be used.
- Respondents were "particularly interested" in cannabis's effects on "children, youth and pregnant women".

In order to limit election interference, the results of the poll were held until after the territorial election on 30 October.

== History ==
In the 1980s, W. C. E. Rasing studied conditions in the Inuit village of Igloolik, and reported that 40–60% of the population aged 12 to 40 used cannabis or hashish. This is in contrast to a 1970 study in the same village which reported only occasional alcohol abuse, and no other substance abuse.

== Enforcement ==
In 2016, Nunavut along with the Northwest Territories saw a decrease in cannabis arrests compared to previous years, with 16 charged with cannabis possession and 45 charged with cannabis trafficking in 2016.

== Naming ==
As cannabis has been introduced to Nunavut it does not have a traditional Inuit-language name. There are two Inuit languages recognised by the Nunavut government, Inuinnaqtun and Inuktitut, and both have several dialects. The Office of the Languages Commissioner of Nunavut (Inuit Uqausinginnik Taiguusiliuqtiit) picked surrarnaqtuq (ᓱᕐᕋᖕᓇᖅᑐᖅ in Inuktitut syllabics) meaning "to have an effect", which can also refer to being under the influence of alcohol.

=== Other names ===
Other names for cannabis used in Nunavut include:

- ujarak (ᐅᔭᕋᒃ) "rock" in reference to being "stoned"
- miluksi or milutsi from the word for inhaling
- aangajaarnaqtuq (ᐋᖓᔮᕐᓇᖅᑐᖅ) or aangayaarnaqtuq a word meaning "to be drunk"

== Legalized cannabis for recreational use ==
Due to delays caused by the 30 October 2017 territorial election, Nunavut was the last territory to announce its legal cannabis framework. Cannabis had already been legal in Nunavut for medical purposes.

By early October 2018, the plans and rules were set. Sales would be made online, by phone and through government agents of the Nunavut Liquor and Cannabis Commission (NULC). All of the products were initially provided by Tweed, which offers 10 different strains of marijuana as well as product lines like "Leafs by Snoop". Initially, no stores would sell cannabis, but private enterprise stores may be allowed a license in the future. Communities are not allowed to declare a prohibition on cannabis use, but can refuse to allow the construction of cannabis stores. The minimum age for possession or use is 19. Restrictions on smoking cannabis are the same as for smoking tobacco. The NWT government considered the legalization of lounges where cannabis may be consumed in a format other than smoking. No more than 30 grams (1 oz) may be bought at one time by an individual, or carried in public.

== See also ==
- Cannabis in Greenland
- Cannabis in Alaska
- Cannabis on Canadian Indian reserves
