= Cannabis on American Indian reservations =

Indian reservations

Cannabis on American Indian reservations was historically regulated under United States federal law. However, the August 2013 issuance of the Cole Memorandum opened discussion on tribal sovereignty pertaining to cannabis legalization. A clarifying memo in December 2014 stated that the federal government's non-interference policies that applied to the 50 states, would also apply to the 326 recognized American Indian reservations. Reservations are therefore able to independently regulate cannabis possession and sale irrespective of laws in any bordering US states.

== By tribe ==
=== Shinnecock Indian Nation ===
The Shinnecock Indian Nation opened its first cannabis shop, called Little Beach Harvest, in November 2023.

=== Oglala Sioux nation ===
The Oglala Sioux nation legalized industrial hemp in 1998, and the family of Alex White Plume began to produce the crop from 2000–2002, but federal authorities destroyed his crops and issued him a restraining order forbidding further cultivation.

In January 2014, the Oglala Sioux tribal council approved a proposal to hold a tribal vote to decide on legalizing marijuana on the Pine Ridge Indian Reservation in South Dakota, but the council later rejected the proposal.

In March 2020, members of the tribe voted to legalize medical and recreational cannabis on the reservation.

=== Flandreau Santee Sioux Tribe ===
In mid-2015, the Flandreau Santee Sioux Tribe stated their intent to begin growing cannabis on one authorized site on their reservation, and commence selling the product on January 1, 2016, following a vote of tribal authorities which decided 5–1 to legalize cannabis. Under the regulation, buyers are required to consume the product on tribal property.

In November 2015, the tribe burned its cannabis crop after discussions with the state and federal attorney's general indicated they were at risk for a federal raid. A representative of the tribe stated in February 2016 that the tribe would pursue legislative solutions to move forward with their cannabis project.

=== Menominee Indian Reservation ===
In August 2015 the Menominee Indian Reservation in Wisconsin held a vote on proposed measures to legalize medical and/or recreational cannabis. The Menonimee are uniquely placed in the state, as the only American Indian reservation which falls only under federal law, rather than under Wisconsin Public Law 280 like all other reservations in the state, meaning that the state of Wisconsin cannot prevent legal changes within the sovereign reservation. In an "advisory vote", the tribal membership voted 77% in favor of legalizing medical cannabis, and 58% in favor of legalizing recreational; the tribal Chairman stated that tribal legislators would next decide whether to move forward on the two issues.

=== Navajo Nation ===
In 2016, the Navajo Nation signed its first resolution to grow industrial hemp, with the goal of adding hemp as a cash crop to their existing 70,000 acre (approx. 283 km^{2}) farm. They authorized Navajo Agricultural Products Industry in collaboration with New Mexico State University to conduct a hemp growing pilot project in 2019.

In 2020, the Nation amended its criminal code to clarify the definition of cannabis versus hemp and to enhance penalties for growth, possession, and distribution of cannabis on tribal lands.

In 2023, federal authorities seized over 60,000 pounds of cannabis plants from Dineh Benally, the former president of the San Juan River Farm Board, who along with business partners had been growing the crops on 400 acres of farmland in the northeast corner of the Navajo Nation reservation. He had presented his operations within the reservation as legal hemp farming. In 2024, Navajo Nation authorities charged Benally and business partner Farley BlueEyes on related crimes.

=== Suquamish Tribe and Squaxin Island Tribe ===
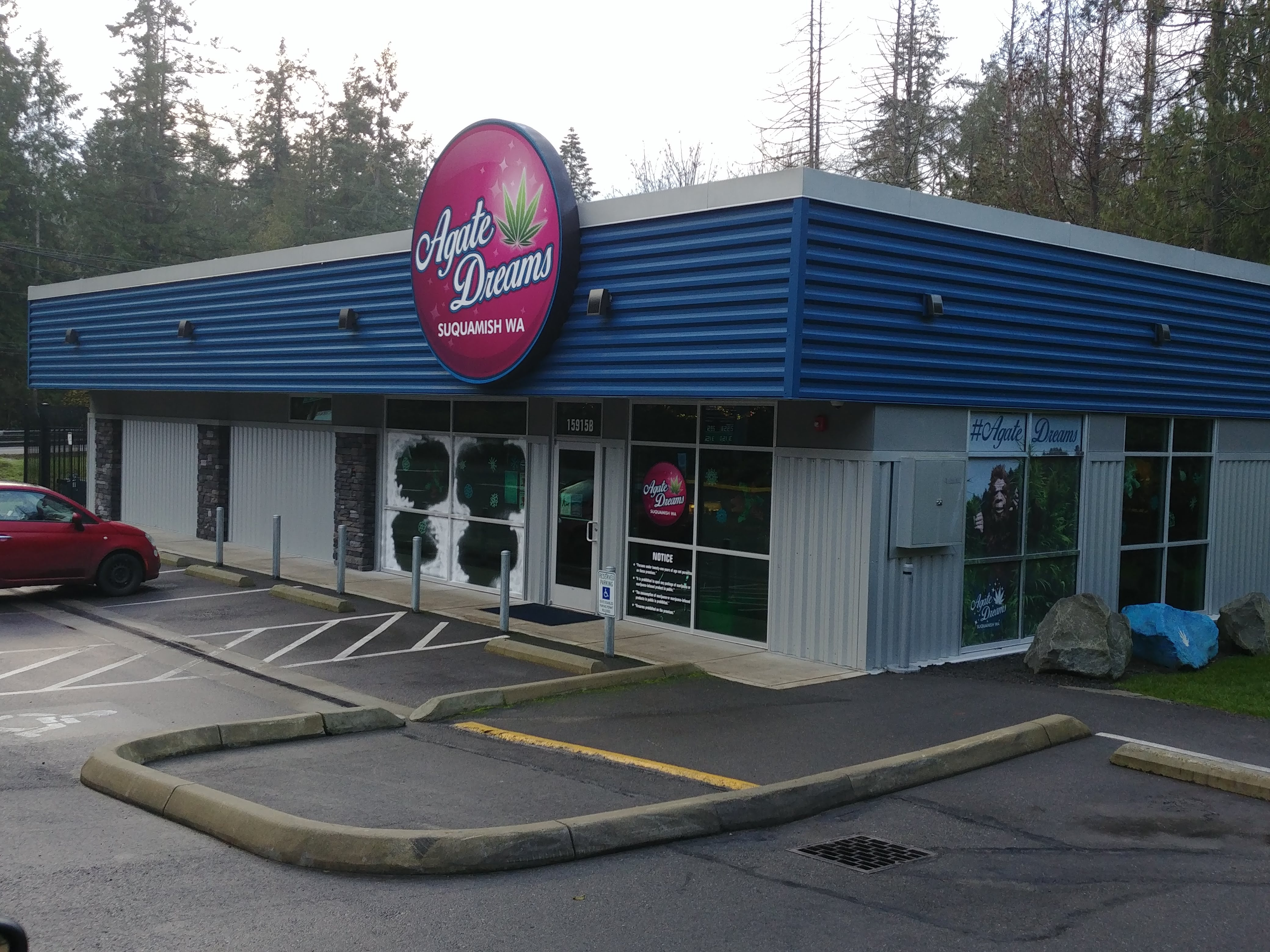
Suquamish cannabis shop on the Port Madison Indian Reservation

The Squaxin Island Tribe opened the United States' first tribal-controlled cannabis store, "Elevation", in November 2015. The Suquamish Tribe in Western Washington began selling cannabis in December 2015, collecting the same 37% tax as the surrounding state. Both tribes legalized marijuana internally, and signed 10-year compacts with the Washington State Liquor and Cannabis Board.

The Squaxin Island Tribe's Island Enterprises began growing cannabis in 2017, in the Skokomish River Valley on what they called the state's first licensed outdoor farm.

=== 2015 Modoc County raids ===
In July 2015, a joint operation by the Drug Enforcement Administration and the Bureau of Indian Affairs shut down grow operations on two reservations in Modoc County in Northern California. Plants and prepared cannabis were seized, but no arrests were made; news reporting indicated that the informant whose complaint sparked the raid was involved in a political power struggle with one of the growers, who is also her brother.

=== Puyallup ===
Commencement Bay Cannabis, operated by the Puyallup Tribe, opened on tribal property in Fife, Washington in 2017. The city does not allow cannabis sales, but the tribe operates outside the city's jurisdiction.

=== S’Klallam ===
In December 2017, the Port Gamble Band of S’Klallam Indians entered a compact with the State of Washington to sell cannabis on its land. High Point Cannabis was opened by the tribe's investment enterprise, Noo-Kayet Investments, the same year, which operated out of a trailer until building its first retail storefront in 2023.

The Jamestown S'Kallam Tribe opened the Cedar Greens Cannabis shop in October 2019.

=== Crow Tribe ===
The Crow Tribe of Montana legislative branch approved adult-use cannabis sales on April 16, 2021.

=== St. Regis Mohawk Tribe ===
The St. Regis Mohawk Tribe in New York legalized adult-use cannabis on June 28, 2021. Under the legislation, dispensaries must be licensed by the tribe, and all growing, processing, and sales must occur on tribal lands. Adult tribal members are permitted to grow up to twelve plants.

=== Eastern Band of Cherokee Indians ===
In 2023, the Eastern Band of Cherokee Indians voted to legalize recreational cannabis on tribal lands. The tribe opened its first dispensary for medical cannabis, which serves both tribe members and the general public, on 20 April 2024 with plans to expand into recreational cannabis sale in the future.

=== Omaha Tribe of Nebraska ===
The Omaha Tribe of Nebraska legalized medical and non-medical cannabis in mid July, 2025.

== Opposition on tribal lands ==
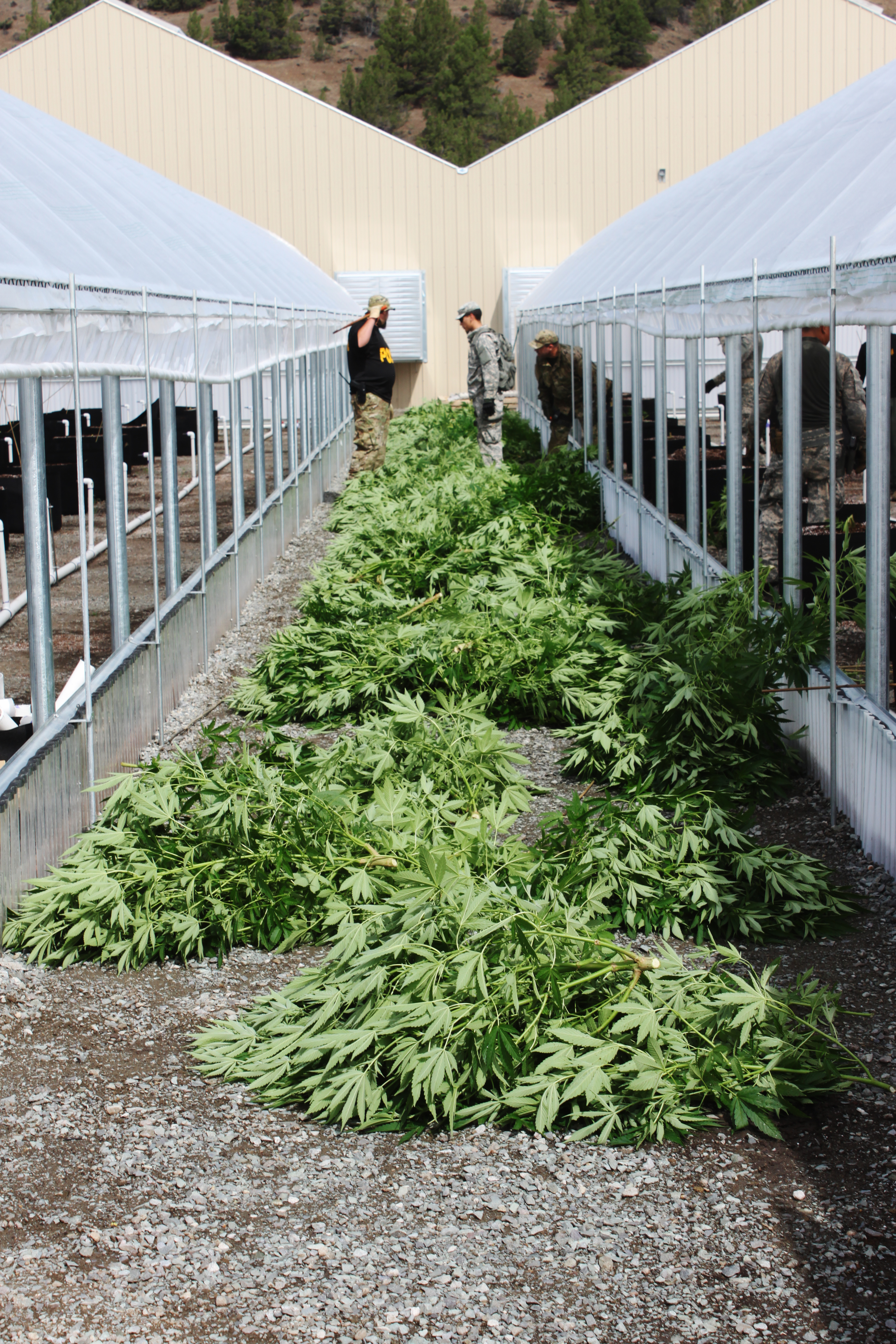
Bureau of Indian Affairs and the Drug Enforcement Administration Fresno Area Surveillance Team and local sheriffs eradicate illicit marijuana on Pit River tribal lands, 2015

The Washington Post in 2014 noted that the Yakama Nation of Washington State, following the state's legalization of cannabis, opposed legalization in ten state counties containing what the tribe considers its traditional lands.

== Legalization by tribe ==
These are the following 13 Indian Reservation that have legalized cannabis.

- Santa Ysabel Indian Reservation
- Elko Colony
- Tule River Indian Reservation
- Bay Mills Indian Community
- Big Valley Rancheria
- Las Vegas Paiute Indian Reservation
- Pine Ridge Indian Reservation
- Shinnecock Reservation
- Omaha Reservation
- Cherokee Indian Reservation
- Ely Shoshone Indian Reservation
- Red Lake Indian Reservation
- Flandreau Santee Sioux Tribe

== See also ==
- Cannabis on Canadian Indian reserves
- Contemporary Native American issues in the United States
- Herbal medicine
- Traditional medicine
- Ethnobotany
