= Elevation (cannabis shop) =

Store in Kamilche, Washington

Coordinates: 47.1308°N 123.1018°W

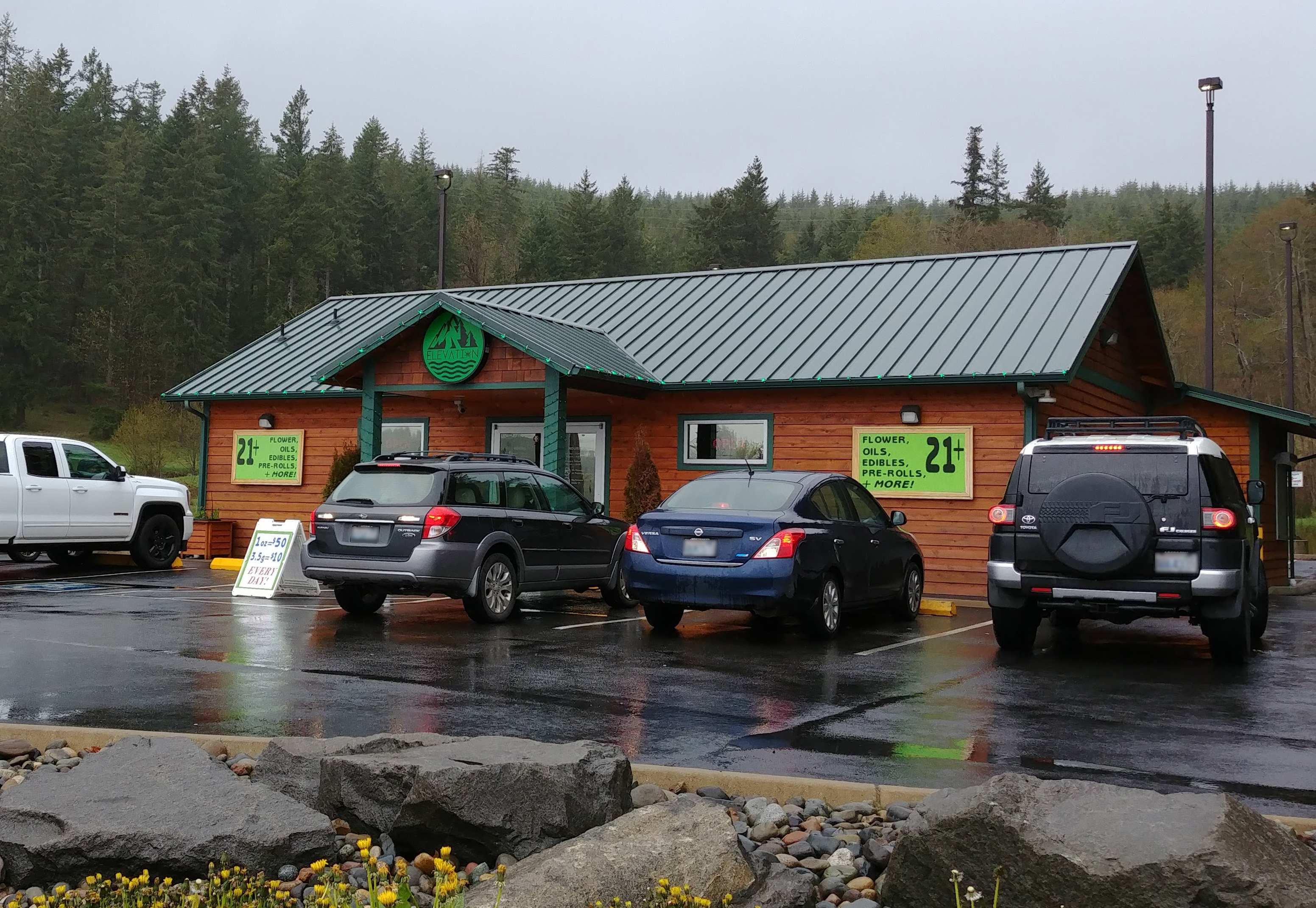
Elevation cannabis shop in 2019

Elevation is a cannabis shop on the Squaxin Island Tribe trust lands at Kamilche, Washington, across Washington State Route 108 from the tribe's Little Creek Casino. It became the first tribally operated cannabis shop in the United States in November 2015.

== See also ==
- Cannabis on American Indian reservations
