= Cannabis on Canadian Indian reserves =

- Medicinal: Legal
- Recreational: Legal
- Hemp: Legal

Cannabis on Canadian Indian reserves became legal under the Cannabis Act on October 17, 2018, subject to local restrictions. First Nations leaders have called for more local control of the cannabis economy on their reserves.

== Planning stages ==
In December 2016, tribal leaders discussed the impacts that legal cannabis would have during the annual Assembly of First Nations. Opinion was divided, with some chiefs calling for a delay in legalization to allow them to make plans, while others were enthused about the economic advantages they expected to come with legalization. There was, however, broad consensus that cannabis regulations on Indian reserves should be left to the members of the community, rather than default to following the province's regulations.

== Specific nations ==
=== Oneida Nation ===
In December 2016, the chief of the Oneida Nation of the Thames in Ontario stated that his community was applying for a cannabis cultivation licence. The nation already has a cannabis dispensary, for which they believe they should not need a licence.

=== Manitoba First Nations ===
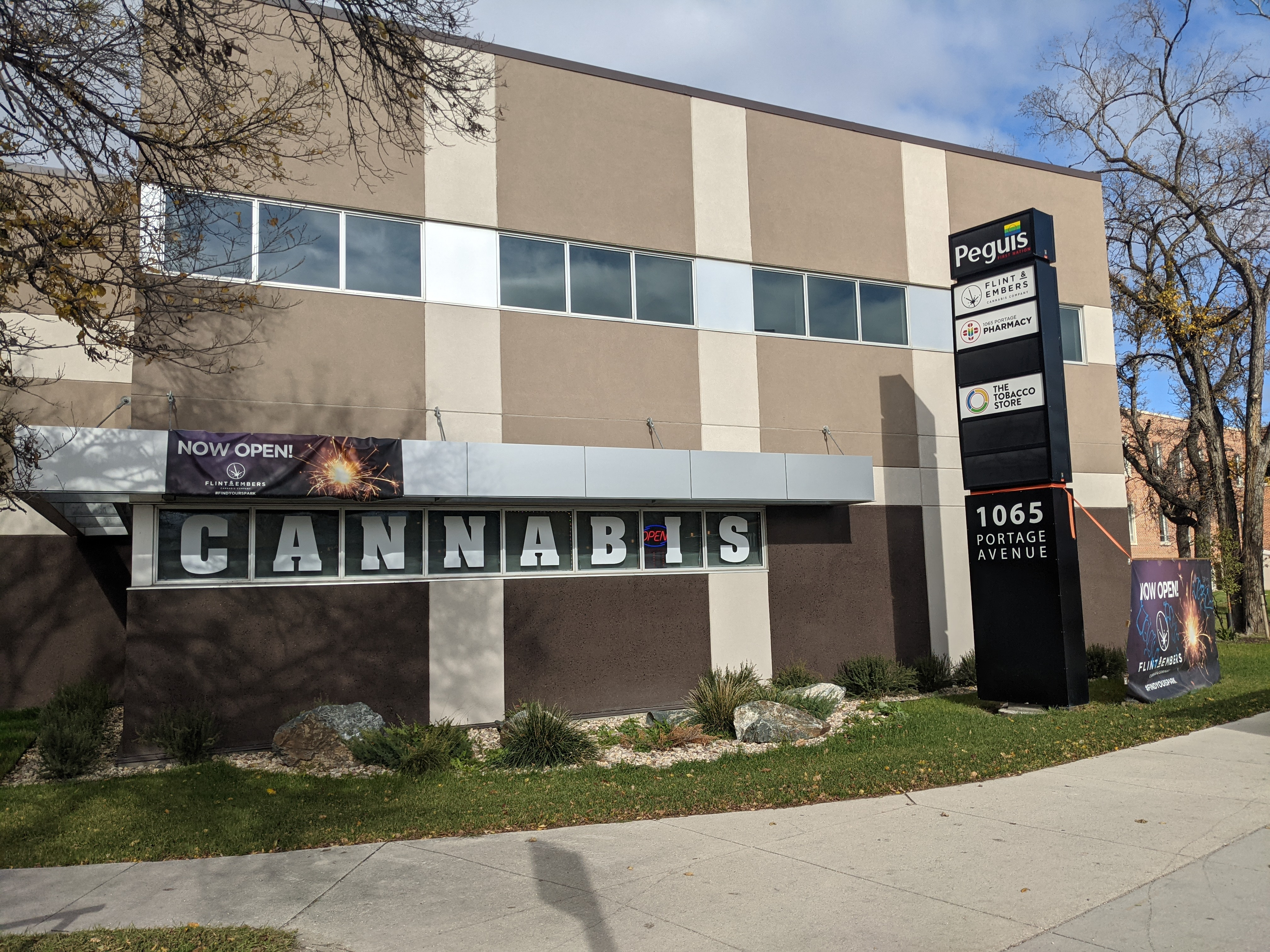
Flint & Embers, Peguis First Nation's cannabis store on its urban reserve in Winnipeg.

Three nations in Manitoba, Opaskwayak Cree Nation, Long Plain First Nation, and Peguis First Nation, formed an alliance with National Access Cannabis in 2016, seeking to gain profit for their communities from legalization, and lobby for their interests on issues such as tax rebates for cannabis sold on reserves.

=== Tobique First Nation ===
In October 2016, the medical cannabis dispensary on the Tobique First Nation reserve in New Brunswick was raided by the Royal Canadian Mounted Police. The dispensary was illegal under national law, but was approved by the band council, causing a disjunct and raising issues of tribal sovereignty. The community reacted with anger to the raid, with 50 members forming a blockade to prevent RCMP officers from leaving. The manager of the dispensary stated to news media: "Our laws, our laws... Your laws, your laws."

=== Mohawk ===
The Mohawk Nation have a cannabis cultivation permit as of 2018.

== See also ==
- Cannabis in Nunavut
- Traditional medicine (Herbalism)
- Ethnobotany
- Cannabis on American Indian reservations
- Index of Aboriginal Canadian-related articles
