= Fernando Grostein Andrade =

Brazilian filmmaker

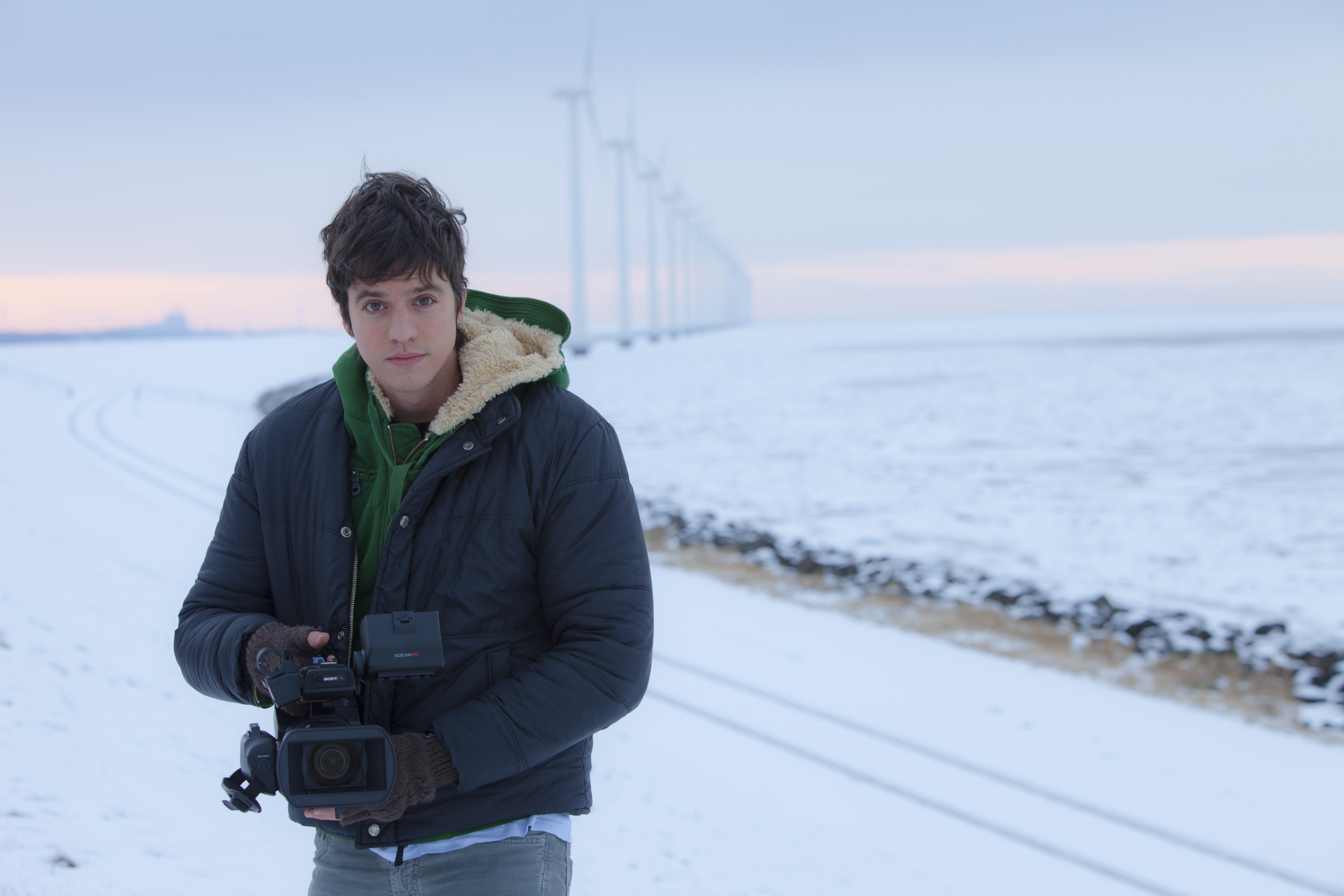
- Born: January 30, 1981 (age 45); São Paulo, Brazil
- Occupation: Filmmaker
- Spouse: Fernando Siqueira
- Relatives: Luciano Huck (half-brother)

Fernando Grostein Andrade (born January 30, 1981) is a Brazilian filmmaker, director, producer, screenwriter, director of photography, and media entrepreneur. He was a columnist for VEJA magazine and the newspaper Folha de S. Paulo. His best-known work is the documentary Breaking the Taboo, which discusses alternative policies to the war on drugs and features former Brazilian president Fernando Henrique Cardoso as well as former US presidents Bill Clinton, Jimmy Carter, infectologist Drauzio Varella and writer Paulo Coelho. In 2012, in partnership with Sun Dog Pictures, owned by British entrepreneur Richard Branson, the documentary was adapted into an international version which was narrated by actor Morgan Freeman. The project has spun off into the largest online platform in defense for human rights, with over 15 million followers between Facebook and Instagram.

Abe, his most recent movie, was selected to the Sundance Film Festival in 2019, and stars Noah Schnapp and Seu Jorge.

Fernando was also selected a Young Global Leader by the World Economic Forum in 2019. He is a founder of Spray Media, which produces content for cinema as well as YouTube and branded content.

Other works include the documentary Wandering Heart, with Caetano Veloso, and a number of publicity campaign for big brands such as Nestlé, Coca-Cola, and Volkswagen.

== Career ==
Fernando graduated in Business Administration from Fundação Getúlio Vargas in 2003. Later, he completed directing and screenwriting courses at CINUSP, University of Southern California (USC) and University of California, Los Angeles (UCLA). He started his career in communication working at the agency DM9DDB and at broadcast station Rádio Jovem Pan 2, at 15 years old. When he was 16, he would write articles and chronicles for Playboy and Trip magazines.

=== Quebrando o Tabu ===
In 2011, he released his documentary Breaking the Taboo, which discusses alternative policies to the war on drugs and features former Brazilian president Fernando Henrique Cardoso as the host. Shot in 18 cities around the world with locations that range from poppy plantations owned by the FARCs to the coffeeshops in Amsterdam, the feature still has testimonials from prominent personalities such as former US presidents Jimmy Carter and Bill Clinton, former Colombian president César Gaviria, former Mexican Secretary of Foreign Affairs Jorge Castañeda, infectologist Dráuzio Varella, writer Paulo Coelho as well as police officers, inmates and drug addicts in rehab. The documentary was later adapted for European and American audiences by producer Richard Branson, with the title Breaking the Taboo. That version is narrated by Morgan Freeman and features Gael García Bernal. The movie was awarded the Audience Award for Best Documentary at the Grande Prêmio do Cinema Brasileiro.

The movie had big repercussions in Brazil, catalyzing debates in the media, in schools and even in Brazilian Congress, with a speech by Senator Eduardo Suplicy. Veja magazine published a 9-page article which characterized the film as a “meticulous report done in 2 years with 168 interviews with notable personalities”. Rede Globo’s prime-time variety show Fantástico exhibited an 8-minute segment about the film and made a poll with the viewers. 57% of them favored legalization of drugs. The documentary was also subject of a cover story of Trip magazine. It received very positive reviews from national and international publications, such as Folha de S. Paulo and The Guardian. Later, it became influent brand of Brazilian independent media. Created by Fernando, it is today the largest online platform in defense of human rights, with the highest Facebook involvement rate in Brazilian media and 15 million followers between Facebook and Instagram.

In 2018, the Quebrando o Tabu project unfolded yet again into a documentary TV series, in which Fernando works as a show runner. The show Quebrando o Tabu received the Mipcom Award in 2019 in Cannes and the Gold World Medal in the Social Issues category at the New York TV and Film Festival 2019. In the same year, it was broadcast by Brazilian network GNT. Each episode deals with a controversial theme, such as abortion, prostitution, privacy, privatizations, democracy and racism, and features specialists who help to expose a constructive discussion around each topic. Currently, the show is in its second season. Fernando is also the creator of the series, and has directed 8 episodes.

=== Film and television ===
In 2001, Fernando directed his first short film, named De Morango. It introduced actor Guilherme Berenguer, who co-starred with Fernanda Rodrigues and Daniel Dantas. The short film also opened the Brasília International Film Festival, the São Paulo International Film Festival and the Palm Springs International Festival of Short Films.

In 2003, Fernando embarked on a tour with musician Caetano Veloso through São Paulo, New York and Japan. The project was called Wandering Heart. For 42 days, he documented the artist's discomfort with the success of his first English-language album released internationally, revealing another side of the composer. Featuring filmmakers Michelangelo Antonioni and Pedro Almodóvar and songwriter David Byrne, the documentary was released by Paramount in Brazil. Written, produced and edited by Fernando, it was screened at the It's All True Festival and in the Rome Film Festival in 2008. According to Eric J. Lyman, from The Hollywood Reporter, it was one of the “weekend highlights”. Wandering Heart was one of the last filmed records of Michelangelo Antonioni, who died in 2007. The film critic and founder of It's All True Festival, Amir Labaki, considered the documentary “the most revealing portrait of Caetano”. Marcelo Janot, critic for O Globo newspaper, described it as “the best film in the recent trend of documentaries on Brazilian musicians”.

In 2010, Fernando directed a short-length documentary called Jornal do Futuro, which registered the changes in the newspaper Folha de S.Paulo during the launching of their own online platform, Folha.com.

In 2012, Fernando participated in the initiative Colors for Love, a project led by Italian magazine Colors. He directed the short film Cine Rincão, which portrays the story of Paulo Eduardo, a young man from the outskirts of São Paulo, who survived after being shot in the chest and went on to study film at the Instituto Criar, an NGO that teaches filming techniques to low-income teenagers. In the end of the movie, Paulo Eduardo constructs Cine Rincão, a theater with free movie screenings for children and youngsters of the community. With soundtrack by Caetano Veloso and Lucas Lima, the short was selected for the competition Your Film Festival at the Venice Film Festival in 2012. The initiative was a partnership between the festival and Scott Free, Ridley Scott’s production company.

In 2014, Fernando participated in a project created to celebrate the 10th anniversary of the NGO Instituto Criar, directing the feature Na Quebrada, partnering up with Globo Filmes. It was produced by Cadu Ciampolini, Paulo Ciampolini and Luciano Huck. Based on real events, the movie follows a group of low-income youngsters such as Júnior, who has a talent to fix broken TVs, Zeca, who witnessed a slaughter, Joana, a girl who dreams about her unknown mother, and Gerson, whose father has been in jail since he was born. Amid stories of loss and violence, they discover a new way to express their ideas and emotions: cinema.

Fernando directed 5 episodes of the TV series Jailers, which he also produced. The show won the MIPCOM Drama Award in 2017. Two years later, in 2019, it was adapted into the movie Carcereiros: O Filme, produced by Fernando.

In 2019, he completed the documentary Encarcerados, which follows the daily life of penitentiary agents in São Paulo. The movie was in the official selections of the Rio de Janeiro International Film Festival and the São Paulo International Film Festival, both in 2019.

In 2020, Fernando released his first English-language fiction feature film. Abe tells the story of a 12-year-old boy from Brooklyn (played by Noah Schnapp) who tries to unite the Muslim and Jewish sides of his family through cooking, with the help of a chef called Chico Catuaba (played by Seu Jorge). The movie was selected to the Sundance Film Festival in 2019. It was well received: The Hollywood Reporter published in a review that the film is “an appetizing fusion of diverse influences”, and IndieWire called it “Sundance’s most charming film” Variety complimented the directing, made with “energy and enthusiasm”, further stating that the strength of the movie is that it “never talks down to its child characters or the audience”. It was accepted in 26 festivals worldwide.

In the 2023, Fernando co-created the short film This Is a Test with filmmaker Fernando Siqueira. The project was produced as part of NASA’s Deep Space Optical Communications (DSOC) experiment aboard the Psyche spacecraft, testing laser-based video transmission from deep space.

=== Alternative Media ===
Besides his work on film and television, Fernando has directed over 100 ads through his production company, Spray Filmes. He was responsible for the Brazilian Coca-Cola Christmas Campaign in 2015. The 4-minute short was aired on Globo’s prime time. Fernando also produced the campaign “Kombi Last Wishes” for Volkswagen, which was awarded 2 Golden Lions and 5 Bronze Lions at the Cannes Lions Festival in 2014.

Other iconic campaigns directed by Fernando include the Billboard Radio Pride Campaign, the Open the Cage Campaign for Volkswagen, which mixed 3D animation techniques with scenes shot from a helicopter, the campaign celebrating Nestlé’s 90th anniversary, “Novos Amigos”, for Mitsubishi, “Grafiteiros” for Sprite, and “Love and Color”, for Arezzo, in which Fernando partnered up with art director Giovani Bianco.

He also directed music clips, such as “Estranho Jeito de Amar” for Brazilian duo Sandy & Junior, in 2006, and “Eu, você, o mar e ela”, by Luan Santana, in 2016.

=== Other works ===
Fernando is also dedicated to social work. He helped to reactivate the theater group Do Lado de Cá, formed by inmates inside a maximum-security prison. The actors later starred in his feature Na Quebrada, with a number of scenes taking place within that same prison. The movie was made to celebrate the 10th anniversary of the NGO Instituto Criar. The members of the theater group later participated in a number of professional productions, among which are Jailers and Sintonia, a Netflix original series.

Fernando was chosen in 2019 a Young Global Leader by the World Economic Forum, placing him in a group that includes French president Emmanuel Macron, New Zealand Prime-Minister Jacinda Ardern, the former US presidential candidate Tulsi Gabbard, among others.

He is also a co-founder of the educational initiative Mapa Educação, together with current representatives in the Brazilian Congress Tabata Amaral and Renan Ferreirinha. The program was created in 2014 with the goal of prioritizing education as a topic in that year's presidential elections. Since then, the movement has organized a number of conferences and debates with experts. An example is a debate on education organized in conjunction with Quebrando o Tabu in which participated former Minister of Education and then-mayor of São Paulo Fernando Haddad. The movement has actively demanded politicians to comply with their views and promises to better education in Brazil, and has mobilized people from all regions of the country. Currently, the movement is conducting a national study to better understand what the students themselves want for their own education.

Fernando is the founder of Spray Media, a production company behind a variety of feature and short-length films, publicity campaigns and content in a range of diverse formats. It was the incubator of the company NWB, which manages big internet channels, including the largest soccer YouTube channel in Latin America, Desimpedidos, which has over 8 million subscribers.

He has also organized a campaign called “Parada Gay na Radio”, in which many radio stations only played songs by homosexual artists, to fight homophobia in Brazil.

Because of his work with documentaries, Fernando gives lectures in Brazil and around the world. In 2014, for example, he was invited to speak at Harvard University at the Igniting Innovation Summit on Social Entrepreneurship, where he presented a short film about his work that has over 700,000 views.

He was also a columnist for Veja magazine and the newspaper Folha de S.Paulo, the magazine and newspaper of highest circulation in Brazil.

His YouTube channel, @grosteinandrade, has 72 thousand followers. His coming out video, “Cê já se sentiu um ET?”, was the subject of a column by journalist Mônica Bergamo, occupying a full page on Folha de S.Paulo in 2017. Fernando was later interviewed at Rede Globo's Conversa com Bial and on two of GNT's variety shows: Saia Justa and Papo de Segunda.

In 2011, he was listed among GQ Magazine’s Men of the Year.

== Awards ==
He has won 2 Golden Cannes Lions and 5 Bronze Cannes Lions for his campaign Kombi Last Wishes, Gold in the FIAP and WAVE Awards for the campaign EOS Conversível and was one of the 10 finalists of the 2012 Your Film Festival.

In 2017, the series Jailers, based on a homonymous book by Drauzio Varella, won the MIPDrama Screenings in Cannes. The show is a co-production between Globo, Spray Filmes and Gullane. Fernando directed some of the episodes.

Besides the Audience Award for Best Documentary at the Cinema Brazil Grand Prix in 2012, given to the feature documentary, the Mipcom Award in 2019 in Cannes and the Gold Medal Award in the Social Issues category at the New York TV and Film Festival in 2019, given to the TV show, the project Quebrando o Tabu has also received the Noble Partnership Medal from the Canadian General Consulate in Brazil, as well as the Prêmio Cidadão SP, given by Brazilian media outlet Catraca Livre.

In 2019, his movie Abe won the Jury Prize at the Kinder Film Festival in Vienna and the Audience Award for Best Narrative at the Washington Jewish Film Festival.

== Personal life ==
Fernando is the son of PhD urbanist Marta Dora Grostein and journalist Mario Escobar de Andrade, director of Playboy magazine in Brazil, who died in 1991. On his mother's side, he is the brother of the TV host Luciano Huck. He currently resides in Los Angeles with his husband, actor Fernando Siqueira.

== Other websites ==
- Fernando Grostein Andrade at IMDb
