= Great Books (TV program) =

1993 documentary television series

- Created by: Walter Cronkite
- Starring: Donald Sutherland
- Country of origin: United States

Production
- Running time: 60 minutes

Original release
- Network: The Learning Channel, Discovery Channel, Discovery World
- Release: September 8, 1993 – June 20, 2006

Great Books is an hour-long documentary and biography program that aired on The Learning Channel. The series was a project co-created by Walter Cronkite and television producer Jonathan Ward under a deal they had with their company Cronkite Ward, The Discovery Channel, and The Learning Channel. Premiering on September 8, 1993, to coincide with International Literacy Day, the series took in-depth looks at some of literature's greatest fiction and nonfiction books, along with the authors who created them. Most of the narration was provided by Donald Sutherland.

Episodes feature insights from historians, scholars, novelists, artists, writers, and filmmakers who were directly influenced by the books showcased and discussed.

== List of episodes ==
Title	Original air date	Producer	Narrator	Short summary	Commentators
Le Morte d'Arthur	September 8, 1993	Dale Minor	Donald Sutherland	How the theme of hero worship grew from tales of King Arthur in Malory's Le Morte D'Arthur. Included: comments from filmmaker George Lucas on how the Star Wars films evolved from the book.	George Lucas, John Cullen Murphy, Geoffrey Ashe
Frankenstein	September 8, 1993	Jonathan Ward	Donald Sutherland	How Mary Shelley's novel Frankenstein reflects concerns about the consequences of scientific experimentation.	Anne Rice, Anne K. Mellor, Marilyn Butler, Betty T. Bennett, Forrest J Ackerman.
Origin of Species	September 8, 1993	Martin Killeen	Donald Sutherland	Charles Darwin's theory of natural selection has provoked acclaim and debate since it was detailed in his Origin of Species in 1859. Explore the book that revolutionized science and culture. The program examines evolutionary theory from its beginnings with Jean Baptiste Lamarck, the famous Scopes Monkey trial, and how political leaders such as Adolf Hitler have twisted Darwinian theory and used it for their own purposes.	Richard Dawkins, Ernst Mayr, James Moore, Jerry Falwell, John Maynard Smith, John Durant, Rebeecca Cann, Dr. Harold Neu, and Dr. Randolph Nesse.
Alice in Wonderland	June 4, 1994	Eugenie Vink	Donald Sutherland	Alice in Wonderland, by Lewis Carroll, is examined. Included: state-of-the-art computer animation, reenactments and puppets illustrate the story.	Grace Slick, Morton N. Cohen, Edward Wakeling, Selwyn Goodacre, Donald Rackin.
War of the Worlds	June 11, 1994	Dale Minor	Donald Sutherland	A look at H. G. Wells' War of the Worlds. Also: a discussion of the author's life by two of his biographers, David Smith and Michael Coren.	Leonard Nimoy, Michael Coren, Brian Aldiss, David C. Smith, Michael Foote, Howard Koch.
The Art of War	June 18, 1994	Dale Minor	Donald Sutherland	Sun-tzu's The Art of War, a treatise on war and strategy, and its impact on contemporary politics and business.	William Westmoreland, Võ Nguyên Giáp, Asher Edelman, Chin Ning Chu, Arthur Waldron.
Adventures of Huckleberry Finn	September 3, 1994	Dale Minor	Donald Sutherland	Mark Twain's masterpiece grapples with one of the most powerful themes in American history—slavery. This video explores parallels between the events of the book and actual historical events.	Victor Doyno, Justin Kaplan, Nat Hentoff.
The Odyssey	September 14, 1996	Karen Thomas	Donald Sutherland	Take a look at the Greek myths and The Odyssey's lessons of morality. Scholars and critics discuss the impact of The Odyssey on Western literature, as well as the now-familiar heroic traits first seen in Homer's characters.	Jim Lovell, Irene Papas.
The Republic	September 14, 1996	Jan Albert	Donald Sutherland	The Republic has intrigued, provoked, appalled, and inspired readers since it was written in Athens 2,500 years ago. Its author, Plato, has been called the father of philosophy, the first fascist, a revolutionary, and the original idealist. The questions Plato first posed in this book of ideas address conflicts people continue to grapple with today.	Michael Savage, William Bennett, Joseph Brodsky, Thomas Pangle, Martha Nussbaum, Alexander Nehamas, Bonnie Kent.
The Scarlet Letter	September 14, 1996	Eugenie Vink	Donald Sutherland	Learn how the story of Hester Prynne's adulterous relationship with a young minister blows wide open the conflict between private truth and public appearances, the choice between sin and salvation, and the definition of moral versus good.	Nina Baym, Roland Joffé, Lawrence Buell, Carol Karlsen, Charles Hambrick Stowe.
Moby Dick	September 14, 1996	Judith Dwan Hallet	Donald Sutherland	Herman Melville's Moby Dick was published in 1851 to little acclaim. His great novel exploring the themes of good and evil, racial intolerance, and man's relationship to nature was so offensive to contemporary readers that they refused to buy it. Discover how Melville's experiences as a young seaman influenced his story, and how Moby Dick itself influenced scores of American writers.	Richard Ellis, Ray Bradbury, John Bryant, Elizabeth Schultz, Hershel Parker, Laurie Robertson-Lorant, Mary K. Bercaw Edwards, M. Thomas Inge.
The Prince	September 14, 1996	Dale Minor	Donald Sutherland	A look at "The Prince," Machiavelli's treatise on the inglorious nature of government, which made the author's name synonymous with political manipulation.	Henry Kissinger, Hanna Holborn Gray, Roger Masters, Gary Hart, Robert Hariman, and Mark Musa.
Native Son	September 15, 1996	Dale Minor	Donald Sutherland	An introduction to author Richard Wright and to the story told in his literary portrait of racism in America, Native Son. Authors and scholars discuss the two murders and the symbolism behind the fate that white lawyer Bigger meets when he is thrown in jail.	John Edgar Wideman, Keneth Kinnamon, Maryemma Graham, Margaret Walker, Cedric Robinson, Remi Dreyfus, and Michel Fabre.
Gulliver's Travels	September 15, 1996	Jenny Durrin	Donald Sutherland	Jonathan Swift's satirical masterwork Gulliver's Travels is much more than a children's classic. Seventeenth-century England was a country ripe with social ironies, and Swift plucked them all, placing them in a story alive with narrative drive. Discover the inner and outer worlds of Swift and how his prickly prose remains on target today.	Pat Oliphant, Mark Russell, Anthony Clare, Victor Griffin, and Roger Law.
Catch-22	September 15, 1996	Ray Farkas	Donald Sutherland	Interviews with the author, dramatizations of the plot, and comments from World War II veterans reveal the turbulent times that sparked Joseph Heller's creative genius when writing this great antiwar novel.	Joseph Heller, Bill Mauldin, Alan Arkin, Mike Nichols, Art Buchwald.
Freud's The Interpretation of Dreams	September 15, 1996	Eugenie Vink	Donald Sutherland	Using a unique series of dream sequence reenactments based on Freud's revolutionary book, experts and artists escort viewers down the road of the unconscious and into a deeper understanding of the inner life of humans.	Peter Swales, Peter D. Kramer, Barbara P. Jones, and Robert Altman.
Don Quixote	June 28, 1997	Denise Schrier Cetta	Donald Sutherland	Miguel de Cervantes wrote Don Quixote out of a spirit of disillusionment. Yet, the novel lives on as a testament to hope and imagination. Scholars and critics discuss the significance of this important work.	Mario Cuomo, Curtis Sliwa, Carlos Fuentes.
Great Expectations	June 28, 1997	Dale Minor	Donald Sutherland	Documentary on Charles Dickens' Great Expectations tells the story of the book, its creator, its hero, its fans and its interpreters. To tell the story of the novel, freshly dramatized scenes are interwoven with footage from several movie versions as well as an on-the-set look at director Alfonso Cuaron's version released in August 1997. The special also focuses on the city of London which Dickens describes so vividly.	John Irving, Ethan Hawke, Alfonso Cuarón, Douglas Broyles, Michael Slater, Dr. David Parker, Linda Hooper, and George Newlin.
The Great Gatsby	September 13, 1997	Elena Mannes	Donald Sutherland	F. Scott Fitzgerald's novel The Great Gatsby focuses on how the American dream may be unattainable, as seen through Jay Gatsby's desire for Daisy Buchanan. Fitzgerald and his character Gatsby have similar family backgrounds and love lives. The extravagance and imagery portrayed in The Great Gatsby has been the basis for advertising campaigns, and the novel's popularity has inspired several film adaptations.	Richard Lehan, Karal Ann Marling, Jackson R. Bryer, Sam Waterston, Henry Allen, Alfred Kazin, George Garrett, Richard Bausch, and Tobias Wolff.
Walden	September 13, 1997	Ginny Durrin	Donald Sutherland	Documentary explores Henry David Thoreau's masterpiece Walden, in which he describes in depth the two years he spent living in a hut by Walden Pond in Concord, Massachusetts, and emphasized the importance of simplicity and spirituality over materialism. His work inspired people like F.D. Roosevelt, Dr. Martin Luther King Jr. and Mahatmas Gandhi. The special uses dramatic re-enactments, interviews with experts and those who live by Thoreau's ideals to bring Walden to life.	Robert D. Richardson, Thomas Blanding, Richard Lebeaux, Elizabeth Hall Witherell, Vidor Jorgensen, Jack Borden, Michael Kellet, Ray Gerke, Cecile Andrews,
Galileo's Dialogue Concerning the Two Chief World Systems	September 14, 1997	Dale Minor	Donald Sutherland	Perhaps the most visionary and controversial book of its time. Galileo asserted that the Earth was not the center of the universe. Egotistical visionary against bullheaded pope.	Owen Gingerich, Maurice A. Finocchiaro, George Coyne, Charles Curran.
One Flew Over the Cuckoo's Nest	September 12, 1998	Dale Minor	Donald Sutherland	Follow along as author and 1960s counterculture guru Ken Kesey reads dramatic sequences, bringing such inimitable characters as Randall P. McMurphy and Nurse Ratched to life.	Ken Kesey, Jann S. Wenner, John Clark Pratt, Miloš Forman, Dr. Frank Pittman, Ken Babbs, Louise Fletcher, Wavy Gravy, and Saul Zaentz
The Naked and the Dead	September 13, 1998	Lucky Severson	Donald Sutherland	A dissection of The Naked and the Dead, Norman Mailer's post-World War II novel about an American platoon on a Japanese-held island in the Pacific. Included: interviews with the author and with director Oliver Stone, who paid homage to the book in his film Platoon.	Norman Mailer, Oliver Stone, Terry Teachout, Robert F. Lucid, Eugene Sledge, Sam Tanenhaus.
Lord of the Flies	February 13, 1999	Vicki Warren	Donald Sutherland	An examination of William Golding's 1954 novel Lord of the Flies, about schoolboys run amok on a desert island.	Patrick Reilly and Peter Green.
The Red Badge of Courage	February 13, 1999	Nancy LeBrun	Donald Sutherland	A century ago, a 22-year-old named Stephen Crane wrote one of the greatest books ever about the Civil War. This video examines the mind of Crane, and analyzes the classic tale of a young man in the midst of a horrifying, bloody conflict. By bringing to light the fears young people have when moving out into a cold world, Crane's story is able to touch each new generation.	Morley Safer, Bruce Gudmundsson
All Quiet on the Western Front	May 15, 1999	Dale Minor	Donald Sutherland	The great anti-war novel All Quiet on the Western Front takes a look at World War I and the horrors of industrialized warfare. Scholars and critics discuss the impact of this novel and war veterans describe the thoughts and emotions of battle.	Thomas Thornton, Philip Caputo, Professor Brian Murdoch, Professor Jay Winter, Bernd Huppauf, and Julie Gilbert
Heart of Darkness	August 21, 1999	Dale Minor	Donald Sutherland	Published in 1902, Heart of Darkness revealed a pattern of exploitation, corruption, and casual brutality that was to occur again and again over the rest of the 20th century. In this program, parallels are drawn between Joseph Conrad's harrowing novella and the Vietnam War epic Apocalypse Now. Includes clips from Apocalypse Now and Turner Network Television's Heart of Darkness.	John Milius, Adam Hochschild, Norman Sherry, Laurence Davies, Martin Sheen and Homi K. Bhabha.
Dracula	August 22, 1999	Trish Mitchell	Donald Sutherland	Documentary that examines Bram Stoker's novel Dracula. An Irish writer, Stoker claimed that the idea for "Dracula" came to him in a nightmare but literary scholars believe the roots for his work can be found in Eastern European folklore. James Hart, screenwriter for the feature film Bram Stoker's Dracula, offers reasons for the novels popularity and Stoker's biographer, Barbara Belford, gives insight into the man who composed it.	David J. Skal, James V. Hart, Leonard Wolf, Nina Auerbach, Barbara Belford.
Pride and Prejudice	September 3, 1999	Linda Duvoisin	Donald Sutherland	Documentary about Jane Austen's romantic novel Pride and Prejudice. Originally published in 1813, the original version of the novel was written in 1796–1797 under the title "First Impressions," and was probably in the form of an exchange of letters. Director Nora Ephron talks about what makes the book one of the timeless romances, and Helen Fielding, the author of Bridget Jones's Diary, discusses how the concept of scandal has changed the way we live and love.	Nora Ephron, Helen Fielding, Fay Weldon, Edith Lank, and Roger Rosenblatt.
Madame Bovary	February 19, 2000	Dale Minor	Donald Sutherland	Gustave Flaubert's celebrated novel of obsessive ardor undergoes a dazzling retrofit for the screen, courtesy of French neurosis-master Claude Chabrol. The basic story (a woman's selfish quest for happiness ends up obliterating all she holds dear) may be the same, but Chabrol's talent for biting through to the dark marrow of passion makes this a startling experience, even for people familiar with the source material or the numerous other cinematic adaptations.	Dominick LaCapra, Erica Jong, Ann-Louise Shapiro, Dalma Heyn, Victor Brombert, and Éric Le Calvez.
Crime and Punishment	June 10, 2000	Marijo Dowd & Foster Wiley	Donald Sutherland	Swayed by early-19th-century notions of "the great man," Raskolnikov believes that humanity is a weakness heroes discard; he will test himself and his philosophy by killing an old, miserly pawnbroker. Filmed in St. Petersburg and narrated by Donald Sutherland, this program explores Crime and Punishment, Fyodor Dostoevsky's classic examination of evil's intellectual appeal and its moral repercussions. Dramatic reenactments and location footage - even of the actual room Dostoevsky chose for his protagonist - bring the book to life.	Olga Meerson, Harold Bloom, Michael Dirda, Dmitry Dostoyevsky, Edward Wasiolek, Boris Tikhomirov.
The Autobiography of Malcolm X	June 11, 2000	Lynn Doughtery	Donald Sutherland	Get to know the man once deemed the "angriest black man in America". Alex Haley narrates Malcolm X's story of racism in America. Interviews, photos, and archival footage trace Malcolm X's roots on the streets to him becoming one of the most outspoken and charismatic leaders ever.	Michael Eric Dyson, Marita Golden, George W. Haley, Ossie Davis, Mike Wallace, Attallah Shabazz.
The Grapes of Wrath	September 17, 2000	Dale Minor	Donald Sutherland	Documentary about John Steinbeck's novel The Grapes of Wrath. No book captures the desperation faced by American farmers in the 1930s better than The Grapes of Wrath. Steinbeck encapsulates this wrenching time in American history by following his main characters, the Joads, as they flee the devastation of the Oklahoma Dust Bowl with dreams of a better life in California. The program expands the scope of the novel to reveal how characters like the Joads would have fit into the larger picture of American history. Using famous photographs by Dorothea Lange and the music of Woody Guthrie, as well as clips from the 1940 feature film, the program adds images and music to the understanding of the book and the period.	Arlo Guthrie, Susan Shillinglam, Studs Terkel, Gerald Haslam, James J. Rawl, Thom Steinbeck, Robert Demott, Elaine Steinbeck.
Nineteen Eighty Four	October 11, 2000	Ned Judge	Nick McArdle & Donald Sutherland	A documentary about George Orwell's novel 1984, about the imagined totalitarian society of Oceania. The program puts the novel in historical and social context and draws on clips from the 1984 film starring John Hurt as anti-hero Winston Smith, who falls in love as rebellion against his job rewriting history.	Margaret Drabble, Bernard Crick, David Brin, Ray Kurzweil.
Les Misérables	December 24, 2000	Marijo Dowd & Foster Wiley	Uma Thurman	Documentary about Victor Hugo's novel Les Misérables. Victor Hugo's 1862 masterpiece not only reflects his intense concern with penal reform, but it more broadly captures the burdens of the poor and working class—a "first" in popular literature—in the guise of a gripping human drama. The novel tells the epic story of Jean Valjean, a good man condemned to hard labor for petty theft, and his tormented attempts to regain freedom and dignity in the shadow of the merciless legal system. The program explores Hugo's prolific artistry and political activism.	Victor Brombert, Graham Robb, Anthony Papa, Mary Brosnahan.
The Jungle	February 17, 2001	Dale Minor	James Belushi	Upton Sinclair's groundbreaking exposé of Chicago's meatpacking industry is a horror story of unsanitary conditions, food poisoning, and child labor abuse. Learn what led Sinclair into this turn-of-the-century urban "jungle" and how his book prompted Congress to pass the first food-safety laws.	James R. Barrett, Jeremy Rifkin, Carol Tucker Foreman, Sara Lilygren, William Bloodworth, Nancy Donley, and Rev. Jim Lewis.
The Right Stuff	May 18, 2001	Dale Minor	Fred Ward	Tom Wolfe wanted to know what "makes a man willing to sit up on top of an enormous Roman candle. . . and wait for someone to light the fuse?" In his groundbreaking book The Right Stuff, his subjects were the Mercury astronauts who became caught up in America's feverish space race, and were hurled into space not really knowing if they would ever come back. Their quiet courage made them national heroes, but the truth of their private lives was carefully hidden. Wolfe's style of New Journalism allowed him to craft a rich text which captured the facts, while including his own emotional reaction to the situation. Wolfe also broke conventions by showing the astronauts as they really were, flaws and all. But by removing the halos that America had placed upon their heads, Wolfe revealed how truly extraordinary these men were.	Tom Wolfe, John Logsdon, Chuck Yeager, Walter Cronkite, William McKeen, Gordon Cooper, and Sergei Khrushchev
20,000 Leagues Under the Sea	August 11, 2001	Dale Minor	Roy Scheider	An examination of Jules Verne's visionary 1870 novel Twenty Thousand Leagues Under the Seas, a cautionary tale of how technology can be used for warfare, and the price of colonial aggression. Included: interviews with writers and scientists.	Gavin Scott, Peter Benchley, Greg Stemm, Richard Ellis, Jean-Michel Cousteau, Jean-Jules Verne, Dr. Amy Wright, Walter J. Miller, Al Charette, and Bruce Jones.
Poe Tales of Terror/Tales of Edgar Allan Poe	October 30, 2001	Dale Minor	Gary Oldman	Explore the psychology of terror in some of Poe's most-haunting tales. Interwoven through these stories is the most tragic tale of all — that of author Edgar Allan Poe. Many of his tales resonate with themes from his own life: abandonment, sickness, and fear. Leading us through Poe's tales of terror are well-known horror writers and directors.	Wes Craven, Ray Bradbury, Colin Dayan (called Joan Dayan), Gerald Kennedy, Kenneth Silverman, Poppy Z. Brite, Jeff Jerome.
The Bible: Book of Genesis	December 24, 2001	Dale Minor	Andre Braugher	The first book of the Bible is analyzed. Jewish, Christian and Muslim scholars add insights and reflect on its impact on Western civilization.	Alan Dershowitz, Thomas Cahill, Jack Miles, Karen Armstrong
The Bible: Book of Exodus	December 24, 2001	Dale Minor	Andre Braugher	An examination of the second book of the Bible, Exodus, in which themes of slavery, flight, liberation and miracles are presented. Included: the parting of the Red Sea.	Alan Dershowitz, Thomas Cahill, Jack Miles, Karen Armstrong.
Inferno	February 23, 2002	Dale Minor	Christian Slater	What are the consequences of our choices? Explore the dark side of human nature and the consequences of sin. Dante’s interpretation of the afterlife has endured as one of the most insightful and scathing reviews of humanity. This program reveals why his fourteenth-century poem has become our defining vision of hell.	Robert Pinsky, William R. Cook, Ronald Herzman, Miriam Van Scott, Fr. Stephen Happel.
Wuthering Heights	May 2, 2002	Dale Minor	Madeleine Stowe	On the cold, damp moors of England burned a love that transcended death. Emily Brontë's novel of thwarted passion and cruelty was considered immoral when it was first published. The central character, Heathcliff, became an archetype for the modern anti-hero. This program compares Heathcliff's character to Brontë's life of isolation and rejection	Juliet Barker, John Plotz, Margret Russett, Edward Royle, Edward Chitham.
The Metamorphosis	August 8, 2002	James Barrat	Jeff Goldblum	What if you woke to find yourself transformed into a giant bug? When a mild-mannered salesman turns into an insect overnight, his family reacts with dismay, recrimination, and ultimately, murder. Gregor Samsa, Kafka's protagonist, finds that alienation, family dysfunction, paranoia, and bureaucracy define life. Learn why the term "Kafkaesque" is still used to define life in the 21st century.	Jeff Johnson, PHD, Kamakshi Murti, PHD, Irmgard Wagner, PHD, David Zane Mairowitz, Arnošt Lustig, Arnold Braun, Peter Rehberg, PhD, Kirk Bloodsworth.
The Wonderful Wizard of Oz	August 30, 2002	Dale Minor	Richard Thomas	As a film, it became a beloved classic overnight. As a book, the Wonderful wizard of Oz has generated controversy for a century, being deemed irreligious by some and banned by schools and libraries as subversive. With readings, movie clips, and dramatizations of many scenes, this program explores the enduring attraction of L. Frank Baum's masterpiece for children and the book's innovative illustrations by W.W. Denslow.	
The Strange Case of Dr. Jekyll and Mr. Hyde	November 8, 2002	Dale Minor	Michael Madsen	Discusses themes of good vs. evil, hypocrisy, sociopathy, and addiction in Robert Louis Stevenson's psychological thriller. Includes dramatizations of scenes from the tale and key moments in the author's life.	
Arabian Nights	December 5, 2002	Graham Townsley	Gina Gershon	This program brings The Arabian nights to life with dramatic reenactments of some of its most memorable tales. The video also explores the origins and literary influence of this classic collection of stories told along ancient trade routes. Experts, including novelist and Arabian scholar Robert Irwin, discuss the book and the colorful history of its translations by Antoine Galland and Sir Richard Burton.	Robert Irwin, Zainab Bahrani, Ron Campbell, Fatema Mernissi, and Justin Frank
2001: A Space Odyssey	June 20, 2006	Dale Minor	William Shatner	For over three years Arthur C. Clarke and Stanley Kubrick crafted what Kubrick called "a myth of epic grandeur". The result was a glimpse into the future that stunned a generation. This program brings together a wealth of material on their prescient book and film, including an in-depth look at their collaboration and insights into th technical challenges of shooting the movie. Along with clips from the film, the program features interviews with Sir Arthur C. Clarke, commentary from Clarke biographer Neil McAleer and Kubrick biographer Vincent LoBrutto, and discussion by several noted experts on artificial intelligence and robotics.	Arthur C. Clarke, Vincent LoBrutto, Neil McAleer, Rodney Brooks, Frederick I. Ordway III (as Fredrick Ordway), Joseph P. Allen (as Joe Allen), Guy Gardner, Rita Kempley, Francis Slakey, Anne Foerst, Ray Kurzweil, Steven M. Wise.

== Portuguese adaptation ==
Grandes Livros premiered in 2009 and was a multi-platform release of Portuguese literature that involves a series of 12 documentaries. Each episode was a biography and documentary at 50-minutes each, narrated by Diogo Infante, actor and director of the Teatro Nacional D. Maria II. The featured episodes include:

1. Os Maias (Eça de Queirós)
2. Os Lusíadas (Luís Vaz de Camões)
3. O Delfim (José Cardoso Pires)
4. Amor De Perdição (Camilo Castelo Branco)
5. Viagens na Minha Terra (Almeida Garrett)
6. Sermão de Santo António Aos Peixes
7. Aparição (Vergílio Ferreira)
8. Livro do Desassossego (Fernando Pessoa)
9. Mau Tempo No Canal (Vitorino Nemésio)
10. Peregrinação (Fernão Mendes Pinto)
11. Sinais De Fogo (Jorge de Sena)
12. Navegações (Sophia de Mello Breyner Andresen)
