= Tabata Amaral =

Brazilian politician

- Amaral in 2026

Member of the Chamber of Deputies
- Incumbent
- Assumed office 1 February 2019
- Constituency: São Paulo

First Lady of Recife
- In role 21 February 2026 – 2 April 2026
- Mayor: João Campos
- Preceded by: Cristina Melo
- Succeeded by: Maria Eduarda Neiva

Personal details
- Born: Tabata Claudia Amaral de Pontes; 14 November 1993 (age 33) São Paulo, Brazil
- Party: PSB (2021–present)
- Other political affiliations: PDT (2018–2021)
- Spouse: João Campos (m. 2026)
- Education: Harvard University (BS)

Tabata Claudia Amaral de Pontes (Brazilian Portuguese: [ˈtabatɐ amaˈɾaw]; born 14 November 1993) is a Brazilian politician and education activist. She is currently a federal deputy for the Brazilian Socialist Party (PSB) representing the state of São Paulo. Throughout 2019, she was a vice-leader of the PDT and its associated political coalition.

As an activist for education in Brazil, Amaral co-founded two organisations: Vontade de Aprender Olímpica, which prepares Brazilian students to compete in international olympiads, and Movimento Mapa Educação, which promotes education equality in Brazil. She also co-founded the political organisation Acredito, which provides funding for progressive candidates running for the first time in Brazil.

Before attending university, Amaral represented Brazil in five international science competitions. She then graduated from Harvard University, with a degree in astrophysics and political science. She was also a columnist for Rádio CBN and Glamour magazine.

== Early life and education ==
Tabata Amaral de Pontes is the daughter of Maria Renilda Amaral Pires, a domestic worker, and Olionaldo Francisco de Pontes, a bus conductor. She has a younger brother, Allan. They were raised in Vila Missionária, a poor neighborhood located in the South Zone of São Paulo, on the outskirts of the city.

Tabata Amaral received her primary education in local public schools. In the sixth grade, at the age of 12, Amaral participated in the 2005 edition of the Brazilian Public School Mathematics Olympiad (OBMEP), and won a silver medal on her first attempt. The following year, due to her gold medal and strong academic performance, she obtained a full scholarship at Colégio ETAPA, a private school in São Paulo, where she completed her secondary education. In the following years, she represented Brazil in international chemistry, astronomy and astrophysics Olympiads.

After finishing high school, Amaral chose to attend Harvard University over offers from Yale University, Columbia University, Princeton University, University of Pennsylvania, California Institute of Technology, and the University of São Paulo. While at Harvard, she wrote a senior thesis on educational reforms in Brazilian municipalities, which won the Kenneth Maxwell Senior Thesis Prize in Brazilian studies, and the Eric Firth Prize for the best essay on the theme of democratic ideals. In 2016, she graduated from Harvard magna cum laude with a degree in Government and Astrophysics.

== Activism ==
After graduating, Amaral returned to Brazil to work as an education activist.

In 2014, Amaral co-founded the education advocacy organisation Movimento Mapa Educação (the Education Map Movement) with Lígia Stocche and Renan Ferreirinha. The organisation crowd-sourced concerns about education among young people in Brazil, and then questioned candidates on those education-related issues during the 2016 Brazilian municipal elections, disseminating their responses widely on social media.

In 2017, Amaral co-founded the organisation Acredito (meaning "I believe") with Felipe Oriá and José Frederico Lyra Netto. The organisation promotes young progressive politicians who are seeking office for the first time, with a particular focus on increasing the diversity of federal deputies.

== Political career ==
=== 2018 election ===
During the 2018 general election, Amaral's campaign for a seat in Brazil's Congress focused primarily on education. She received the sixth highest vote total of any candidate in the state of São Paulo, with 264,450 votes. At the time of her election, she was a member of the Democratic Labor Party (PDT).

=== Deputy ===
Building on her background as an education activist, Amaral became a prominent education critic, and was credited with being partly responsible for the removal of Ricardo Vélez Rodríguez as the Minister of Education in the government of Jair Bolsonaro.

She served on the Education Commission, the Commission for the Defense of Women's Rights, and as an alternate member of the Science and Technology, Communication and Informatics Commission. From February 20, 2019, until April 25, 2019, she was the vice-leader of the PDT Block, the electoral coalition of the PDT. From June until November of that year, she was the vice-leader of the PDT.

=== Bill to define antisemitism ===
In March 2026, Amaral introduced a bill (PL) that sought to define antisemitism for the purposes of public decision-making. PL 1424/2026 stated that antisemitic expressions could target the State of Israel, using the parameters of the International Holocaust Remembrance Alliance (IHRA) as a reference. The text was criticized by jurists and researchers, who argued that the bill could open loopholes for the persecution of critics of Israel's political orientation and of the Netanyahu government. Initially, 45 federal deputies had signed the proposal as co-authors; four days after its introduction, however, at least nine of them filed requests to withdraw their signatures. Heloísa Helena (Rede-RJ), for example, stated that her name had been included without her authorization and that administrative measures would be taken. André Lajst, head of StandWithUs in Brazil, acknowledged that the bill aims to criminalize those who advocate for the freedom of Palestine, stating that the phrase "From the river to the sea" would "soon" be considered illegal.

Among the bill's critics, the lawyer Thiago Amparo, noting that antisemitism has been criminalized in Brazil since 1989, said that one of the definitions in the law has already been weaponized to restrict criticism of the State of Israel; a 2023 report found dozens of cases in Europe in which the IHRA definition was used to cancel events, cut funding for artists and prosecute activists, including Jews who advocate for Palestinian rights. (Note: The International Holocaust Remembrance Alliance definition has been publicly denounced by its principal author, Kenneth Stern, who stated that his creation had been turned into a political weapon, and more than one hundred human rights organizations, including Human Rights Watch, formally asked the United Nations not to adopt the definition.) According to Jacobin as well, the bill's mechanism is hypernomic, that is, its wording is so broad that, in practice, what is prohibited lies not in its text but in the hands of those who enforce it; it was argued that, although it maintains an appearance of legality, it has an authoritarian configuration in at least three provisions. Jacobin also argued that the bill is not even-handed, since it does not mention Islamophobia or racism against Arabs, who are also Semites and targets of antisemitism, maintaining that its true aim is to curb criticism of Zionism. The journalist Glenn Greenwald argued that the campaign to restrict criticism of Israel has reached Brazil because the country is losing the global debate over its expansionist project, the "atrocities" committed in Gaza and the "racial supremacism inherent to Zionism". Greenwald added that the "cynical exploitation" of the Holocaust and the "spurious accusations" of antisemitism trivialize both and have the potential to generate antisemitism when the population perceives that it is being coerced on account of Israel's interests. The timing of the bill's introduction was linked to Israel's passage, in the same week, of a death penalty law applicable exclusively to Arabs and Palestinians, as well as to the number and intensity of war crimes committed both inside and outside the country. Amaral voted for reforming the Brazilian security system, which would raise the retirement age; this was a major policy of Jair Bolsonaro's government, and the PDT opposed the reform. Amaral broke party lines together with 8 other deputies of the PDT to vote in favour of the reform, stating that the reforms would be beneficial for education in Brazil. For this she was temporarily suspended from the party. As a result, in September 2021, Amaral announced that she had left the PDT to join the PSB (Partido Socialista Brasileiro ~ Brazilian Socialist Party).

== Controversies ==
In July 2019, the magazines Veja and Exame revealed that Amaral hired her then-boyfriend, Daniel Alejandro Martínez, to work on her 2018 election campaign. The services were provided between August and October 2018. Amaral's team did not present the results of the services provided by Martínez.

== Personal life ==
Beginning in 2019, Amaral has been in a relationship with fellow Socialist Party member, former federal deputy from the state of Pernambuco, and current mayor of Recife João Henrique Campos. They married on 21 February 2026.

== Electoral history ==
Election	Party	Office	Votes	%	Result
2018 São Paulo State Election	PDT	Federal Deputy	264,450	1.25 (#6)	Elected
2022 São Paulo State Election	PSB	Federal Deputy	337,873	1.42 (#6)	Elected
2024 São Paulo Mayoral Election	PSB	Mayor	605,552	9.91 (#4)	Lost
2026 São Paulo State Election	PSB	Federal Deputy	476,363	2.01 (#5)	Elected

== Selected honours ==
- BBC 100 inspiring and influential women (2019)
- Time 100 Next (2019)
