= Cosmic Odyssey =

Cosmic Odyssey may refer to:

- Cosmic Odyssey (comics)
- Cosmic Odyssey (documentary)
