= Breaking the Taboo =

2011 film directed by Fernando Grostein Andrade

Breaking The Taboo
- Directed by: Cosmo Feilding Mellen; Fernando Grostein Andrade
- Written by: Fernando Grostein Andrade; Thomaz Souto Correa; Cosmo Feilding-Mellen; Carolina Kotscho; Ricardo Setti; Ilona Szabo
- Produced by: Sam Branson
- Starring: Fernando Henrique Cardoso; Jimmy Carter; Bill Clinton; Paulo Coelho; Ruth Dreifuss; Gro Harlem Brundtland; Anthony Papa; Dráuzio Varella; Robert Gallimore
- Narrated by: Morgan Freeman (English); Gael García Bernal (Spanish)
- Cinematography: Fernando Grostein Andrade; Rafael Levy
- Edited by: Leticia Giffoni; Jair Peres; Tony Wilson
- Music by: Lucas Lima
- Production companies: Sundog Pictures; Spray Filmes
- Distributed by: Espaço Filmes (2011); TVF International (2012)
- Release date: June 3, 2011
- Running time: 58 minutes
- Languages: English, Spanish, Portuguese, French

Breaking the Taboo is a 2011 Brazilian documentary film about the war on drugs. The film recounts the history of the war on drugs, beginning with the 1961 Single Convention on Narcotic Drugs. Breaking the Taboo explores the conclusion reached by the Global Commission on Drug Policy in 2011 that drug liberalization is the best approach in dealing with drug policy.

== Overview ==
The documentary features interviews with a number of former heads of state, including U.S. Presidents Bill Clinton and Jimmy Carter, Brazilian President Fernando Henrique Cardoso, and leaders from Colombia, Switzerland, Norway and Mexico. Filmed in 18 cities around the world, Breaking the Taboo has interviews with 168 subjects, including police, inmates, former soldier and now Somerset-based history teacher Robert Gallimore and rehabilitated addicts. The film contains scenery from around the world varying from FARC coca plantations in the Colombian jungle, to Amsterdam coffeeshops, to Afghanistan and the bloated U.S. prison system.

Breaking the Taboo was first released in Brazil in 2011 as Quebrando o Tabu. The documentary was adapted for the American and European market in partnership with the production house Current Sponge, led by Sam Branson, son of the entrepreneur Richard Branson. The English version was released on December 7, 2012 via YouTube for a one-month online run and is no longer available. An addendum to the end of the film notes the passage of laws legalizing cannabis in the US states of Washington and Colorado.

== Reception ==
Following its release in 2011, the film stimulated debate in Brazilian media, schools and the Brazilian congress, with a speech by senator Eduardo Suplicy. Veja magazine published a nine-page article on the film calling it "a meticulously crafted report made over two years with 168 interviews from personalities, including Bill Clinton, Jimmy Carter, Drauzio Varella, and Gael García Bernal, and others less known, but no less credible." The television show Fantástico of Rede Globo, Brazil's largest TV network, aired an eight-minute report on the film and later polled the viewers on the subject, 57% voted in favor of legalization. Trip magazine published a cover story on the film. The newspaper Folha de S.Paulo considered that the film had "A consistent argumentative route, not necessarily aligned with common sense". The film also had repercussions in the English newspaper The Guardian: "The documentary highlights the perils of debating an issue so clouded by ideology and calls for an end to the stigmatization of the debate. It boasts the support of several former world leaders including Bill Clinton and Jimmy Carter."

== See also ==
- American Drug War: The Last White Hope, 2007 documentary
- Chasing the Scream: The First and Last Days of the War on Drugs, 2015 book
