= Harold Thornton =

Australian artist (1915–2004)

Harold "the Kangaroo" Thornton
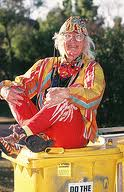
- Born: 1915; Sydney, Australia
- Died: 7 April 2005 (aged 89–90)
- Education: Desiderius Orban's art school
- Known for: Painting, portraiture
- Notable work: Mural outside The Bulldog coffeeshop, Amsterdam (1975); Dr Brown and Green Old Time Waltz (1982)
- Movement: Psychedelic art
- Awards: 5 x finalist, Archibald Prize

Harold Leslie Thornton (1915 – 7 April 2005), also known as Harold "the Kangaroo" Thornton, was an Australian artist. He is known for his eccentric personality and for his portrait of environmentalist Bob Brown, titled Dr Brown and Green Old Time Waltz, which was a finalist in the 1983 Archibald Prize. Four other paintings were finalists in the prize, but he did not gain widespread recognition during his lifetime. He spent several years in Amsterdam in the 1970s, where his mural outside the first Bulldog coffeeshop is still a tourist attraction.

== Early life and education ==
Harold Leslie Thornton was born in 1915 in the Sydney suburb of Enfield, the child of Dulcie and Reg Thornton. His mother treated him harshly, and in addition, he had dyslexia and was bullied at school.

He enjoyed sport as a child, and drawing, but was not very interested in school. He started painting at eight years old in conventional style, and wrote signs for the local butcher and grocer. He left school at 14 to work as a signwriter, learning by observing others.

In 1937, he left Sydney with a friend on a motorcycle, and settled in Griffith, New South Wales until 1941, earning a living from professional wrestling and painting. Returning to Sydney, he worked as a signwriter at several locations related to the war industry, until the end of World War II. He stopped wrestling at the time of the outbreak of the war, and a back injury slowed down his sign painting after the war.

He attended Desiderius Orban's art school in Sydney from 1944 to 1946, and also spent some time at the Julian Ashton Art School, but was largely self-taught.

== Art career ==
Thornton was a prolific painter, and his art career spanned more than 60 years, from traditional portraits and landscapes, to surrealist-type art. He painted in psychedelic style, with bright colours, from the 1980s, and some art commentators classify his later works as Naïve art or magic realist. He was an early Australian proponent of using bold, bright colours.

He returned to Griffith after the war, running his own signwriting business. Between around 1945 and 1954 he used premises on the first floor of bank chambers in Bathurst Street in Sydney city centre as a studio. He was started converting it into a gallery in January 1954, but was evicted from the building. In 1948 he painted a portrait of actor Roy Rene, which was an Archibald Prize finalist in 1949. He scandalised the conservative citizens of Griffith by painting nude portraits.

In the 1950s, he toured with his own mini solo exhibitions in regional New South Wales, before returning to Sydney in 1963.

After spending some time in Moscow, USSR, Thornton moved to Amsterdam around 1970, and then London for a few years, where he painted cartoons. He fell ill and struggled financially there, but was supported by an eccentric group of squatters. He returned to Amsterdam, where he felt at home, to paint. It was there that he changed his artistic name to "Harold the Kangaroo" (ostensibly to make things easier for his Dutch audience), and painted "The Greatest Genius That Ever Lived!" on the back of his jacket. He became well known in Amsterdam. In 1975 he painted a mural on The Bulldog, a cannabis coffee shop, which remains a tourist attraction. It has been called "The Bulldog No.90 mural" because of its address at Number 90 Oudezijds Voorburgwal. It is also a heritage site protected by the Netherlands National Trust. The Dutch Government commissioned him to paint a large poster during his time in Amsterdam.

His friend, Pienke WH Kal, published a monograph titled The colourful life of Harold Leslie Thornton alias the Kangaroo, 1915-2004 (2015), which was compiled and edited by Willem Campschreur.

Returning to Sydney, Thornton's work was exhibited by the Women's Temperance League and Woman's Christian Temperance Union. His most productive years were during the 1980s in Sydney. His psychedelic-style portrait of environmentalist Bob Brown, titled Dr Brown and Green Old Time Waltz, was an Archibald Prize finalist in 1983, and is an example of an historically-themed artwork, rare in Australia. It documented the Gordon below Franklin Scheme in Tasmania, which remains one of the most controversial environmental issues in the history of Australia. He also painted a portrait of politician Al Grassby in 1982, among others. He travelled back to Europe occasionally for work.

He painted a picture of his father on his deathbed, which he continued to finish after his father had died.

== Recognition ==
Thornton was known as a "relentless self-promoter", describing himself as "the greatest genius that ever lived", and his work was admired by artists such as Martin Sharp, Ken Done, and body artist Tim Gratton. However, he was not greatly lauded in his lifetime, and his few solo shows were not successful. In 1945, while living in Griffith, he had a landscape exhibited in the Sydney Art Group show, and his portrait of local identity "Freddie" was accepted for the Christmas exhibition by the Australian Art Society in Sydney.

His paintings were Archibald Prize finalists five times between 1946 and 1983. His 1948 portrait of Roy Rene was a finalist in 1949, and his psychedelic-style portrait of environmentalist Bob Brown, titled Dr Brown and Green Old Time Waltz, was a finalist in 1983. During the exhibition of the 1983 finalists, Thornton stood by the painting in the gallery every day.

Photographer Rhonda Senbergs took many photographs of Thornton, which are held by the State Library Victoria. A photograph of Thorton holding his dog taken in 1977 by Gary Ede was purchased by the National Portrait Gallery in Canberra in 2018.

== Other activities ==
Thornton worked as a professional tap dancer after doing some signwriting, performed on stage as a clown, and created a travelling show with another performer, who was his apprentice sign painter. He also worked as a professional wrestler as a young man.

He opened a restaurant in Papua New Guinea, when he lived there between 1968 and 1970.

Thornton appeared in a short film by acclaimed director Peter Weir, titled Count Vim's Last Exercise, released in 1968. During this time he also met Errol Flynn.

== Personal life ==
Thornton's personality has been described as "exuberant" and "colourful", and he was known for dressing flamboyantly, but fellow artist Dale Trueman described him as also very kind. He found the process of painting comforting, but he was subject to long periods of depression. He once claimed to have died and returned to Earth as a ghost.

Thornton returned to Sydney in the 1980s, where he settled in Darlinghurst. He supported the Greens in their fight to save the Tasmanian wilderness, flying to the island, where he met Christine Milne. He returned to Amsterdam in the early 1990s, taking all his works with him, before returning to Sydney again.

In 1987 Thornton had a lengthy interview with Barbara Blackman, which was recorded and is available online as an oral history.

== Death and legacy ==
Thornton died on 7 April 2004, leaving around 200 paintings in his estate. His great-nephew Chris Osborne guards his legacy.

His portrait of Bob Brown hangs in the National Portrait Gallery in Canberra.

His handpainted cardboard suitcase is held by the Powerhouse Museum in Sydney, along with a collection of "extraordinary outfits" worn by him.
