= Mellow Yellow (coffeeshop) =

Former cannabis coffeeshop in Amsterdam

Restaurant information
- Established: 1972
- Closed: 2017
- Owner: Johnny Petram
- Location: Amsterdam, Netherlands

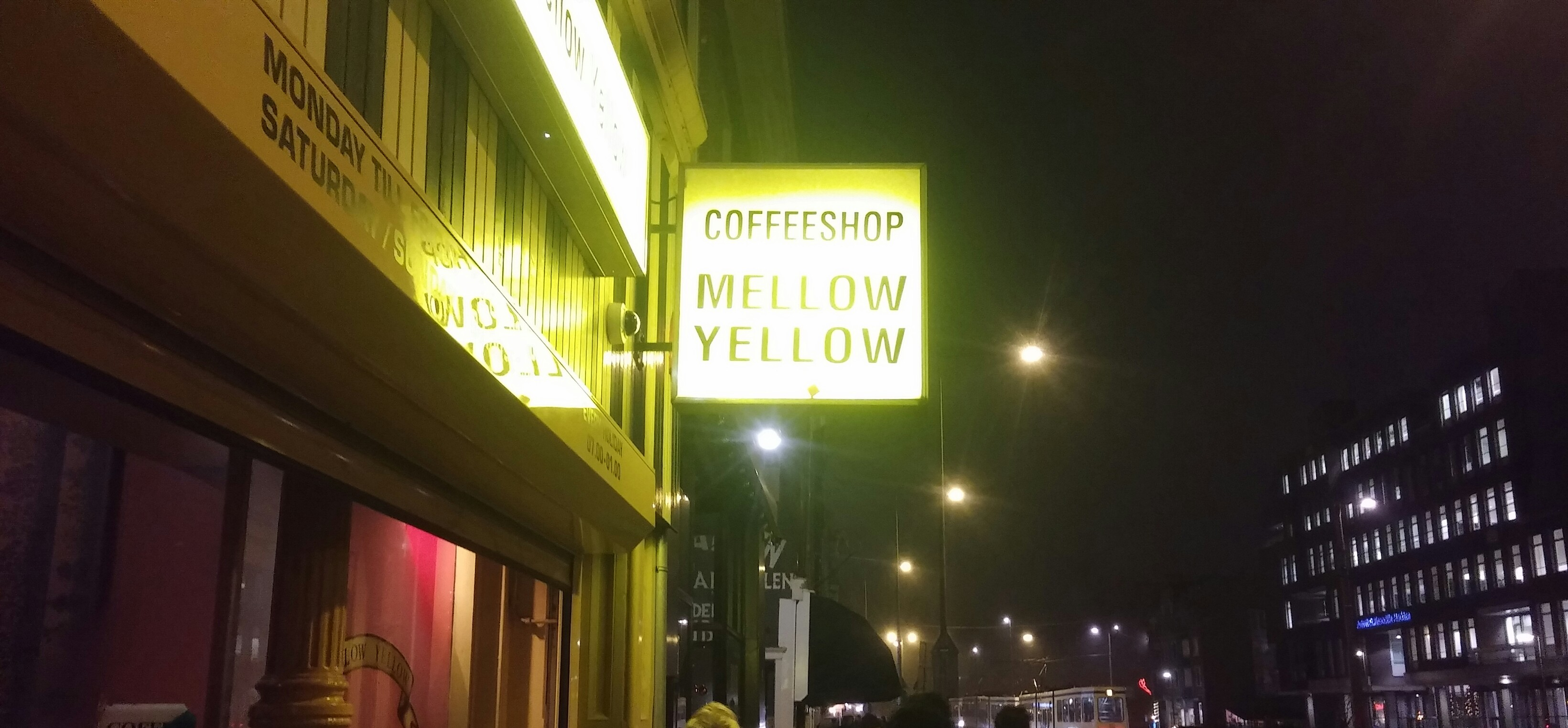
Coffeeshop Mellow Yellow

Mellow Yellow was the oldest cannabis coffeeshop in Amsterdam. It was squatted in 1972 then moved to a new building in 1978. It was forced to close at the start of 2017.

== History ==
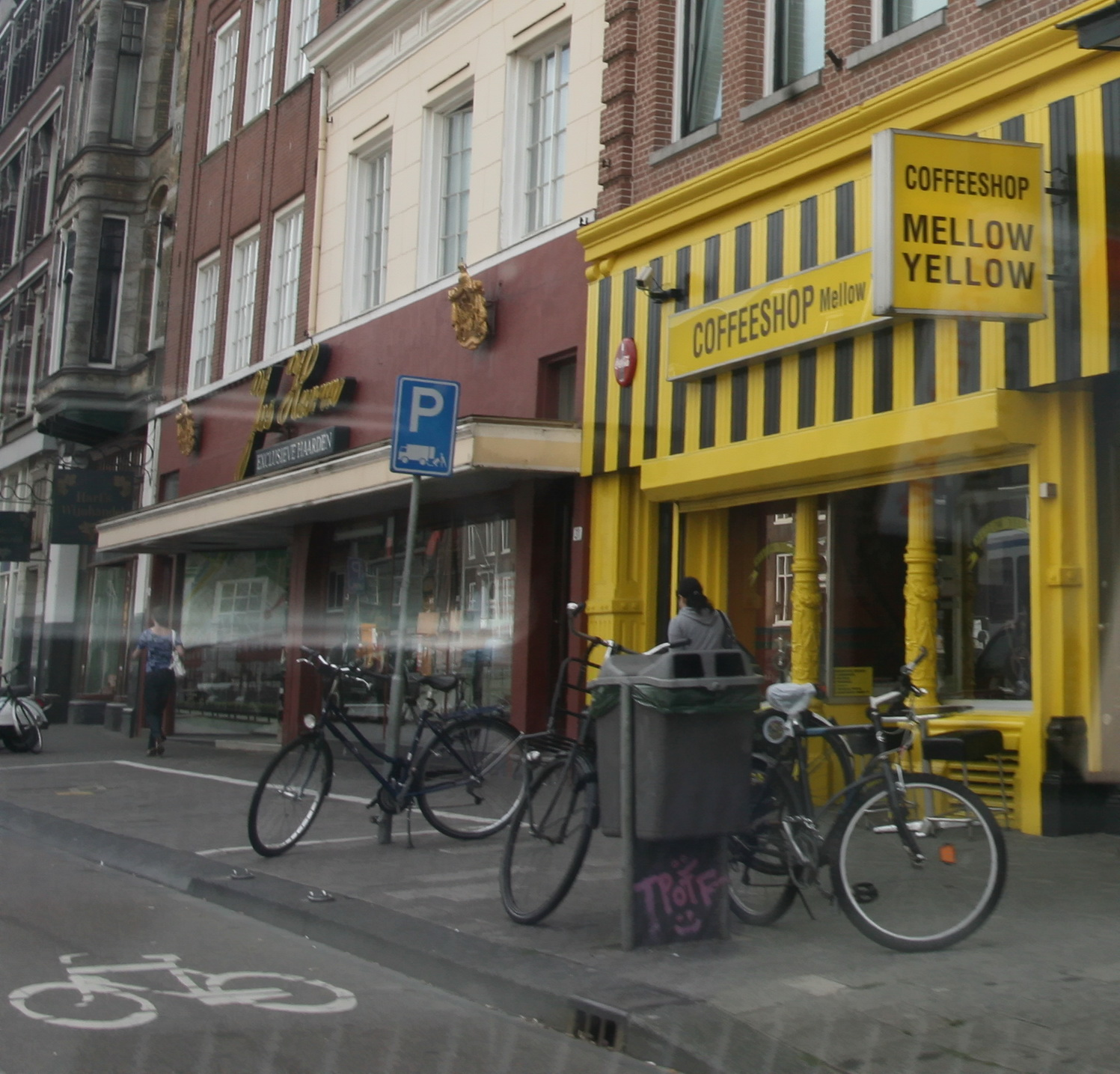
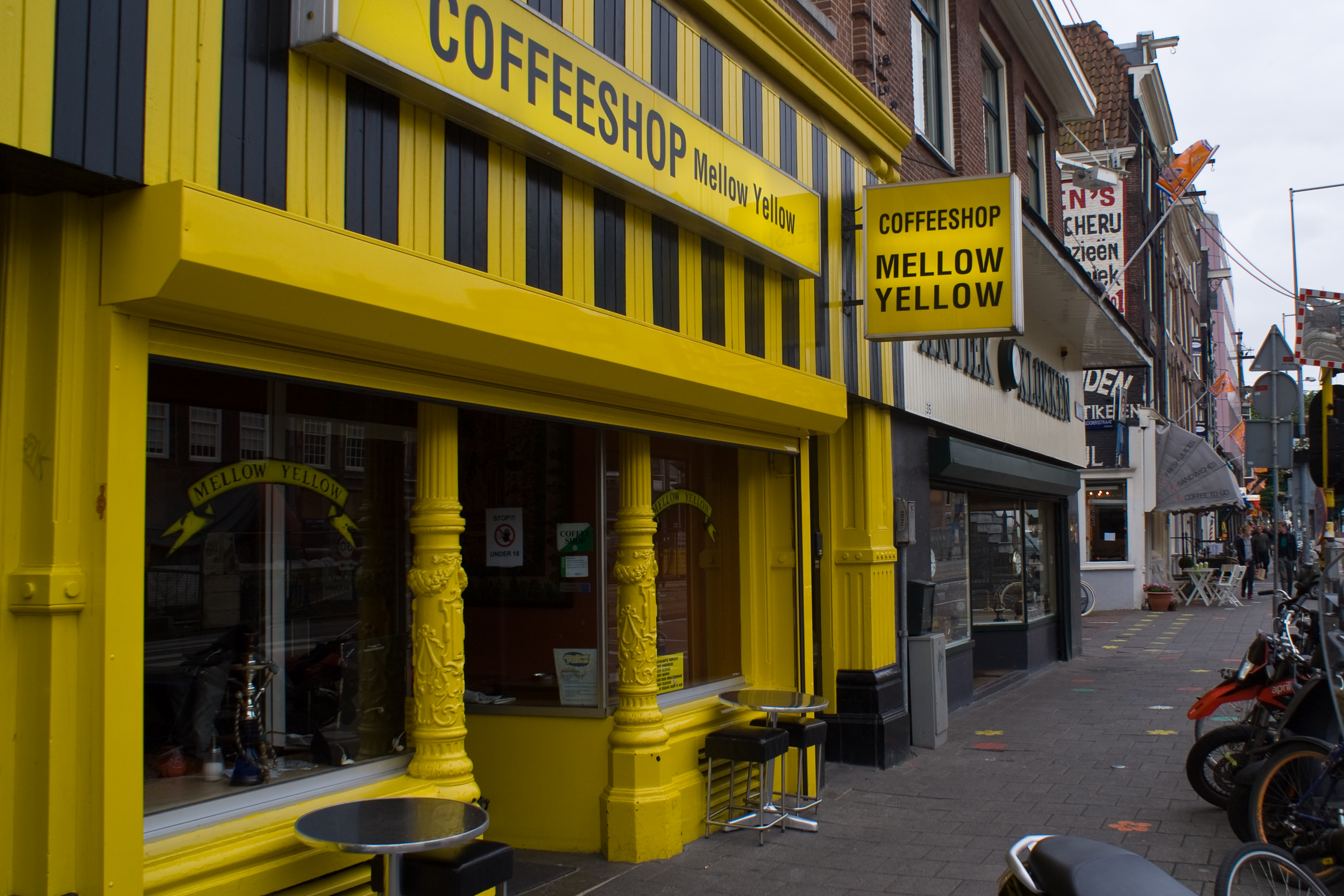
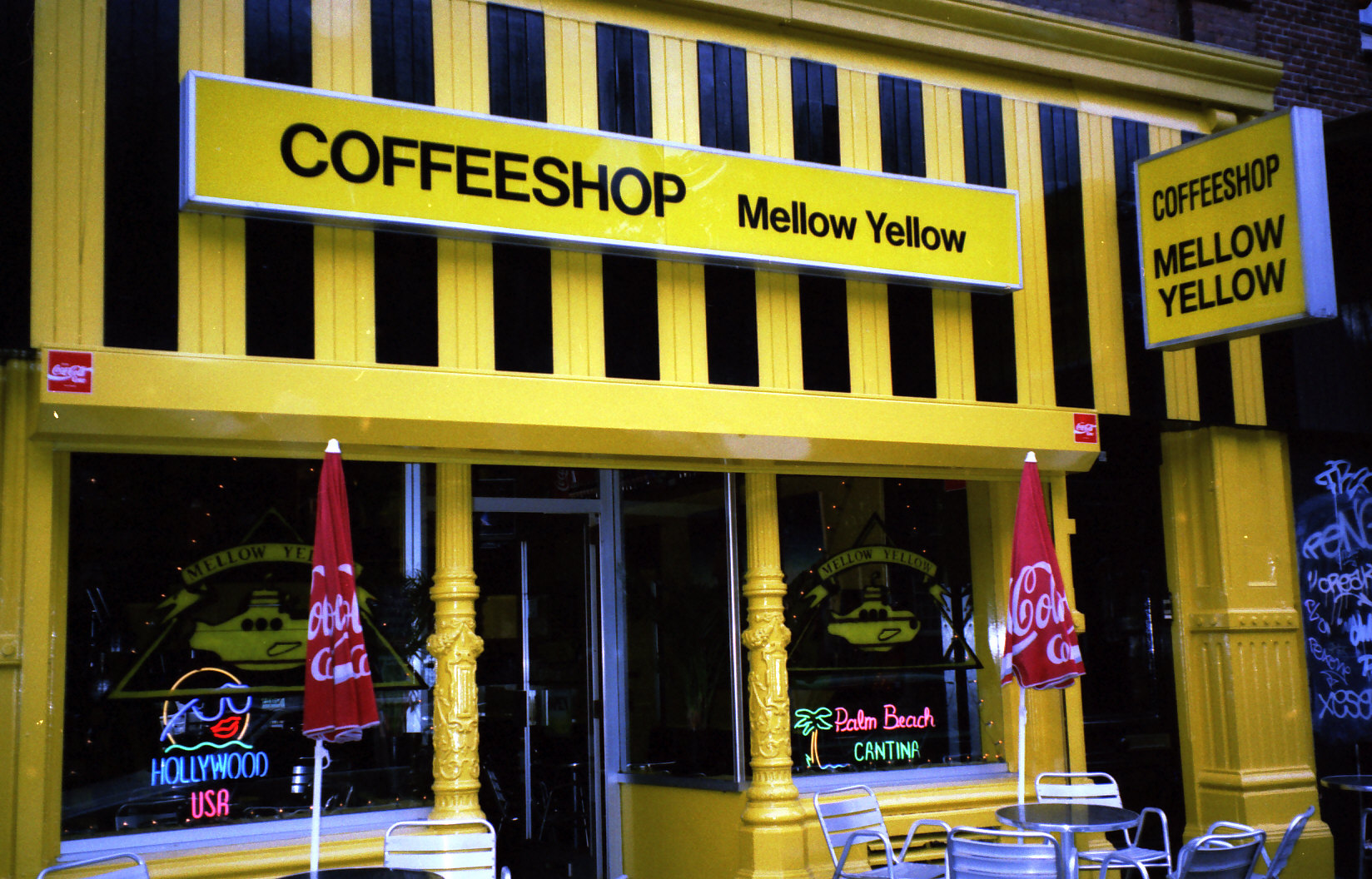
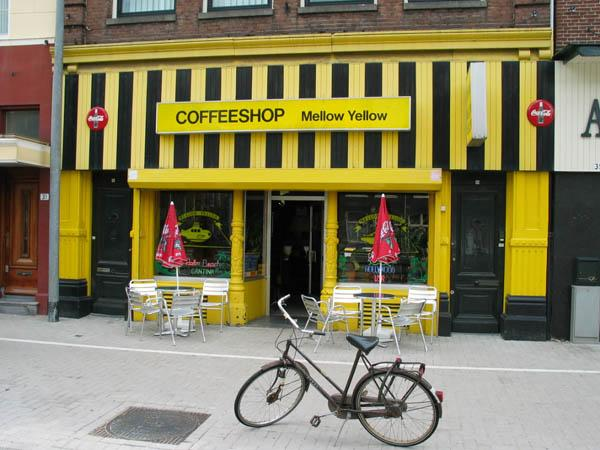

The cannabis coffeeshop was founded in 1972 by the hippie Wernard Bruining and friends in a squatted former bakery on Weesperzijde, Amsterdam. He called it a teahouse, inspired by 1920s and 1930s cannabis cafes in the United States. The shop was named after "Mellow Yellow", a song by the Scottish singer-songwriter Donovan that was rumoured to be about the singer trying to become intoxicated through smoking the peel of banana. It was the first such shop in the world. The intent of the shop was to sell cannabis, despite it being illegal to do so. Other early coffeeshops included Rusland and The Bulldog.

== Closure ==
The shop was closed at the beginning of 2017, under new legislation requiring 28 coffeeshops in Amsterdam located within 250 meters (275 yards) of schools to close. The owner Johnny Petram protested that the school near to his shop was a hairstyling academy with students generally over the age of 18, but the Amsterdam government still required its closure. This is as part of a deal with the national government that exempts Amsterdam from enforcing the wietpas requirements used in other parts of the Netherlands which bans foreigners from coffeeshops. Petram stated his hope that he would be able to reopen Mellow Yellow at a new location.
