= Abe (film) =

- Directed by: Fernando Grostein Andrade
- Written by: Lameece Issaq; Jacob Kader
- Story by: Lameece Issaq; Jacob Kader; Fernando Grostein Andrade; Thomaz Souto Correa; Christopher Vogler
- Produced by: Carlos Eduardo Ciampolini; Noberto Pinheiro Jr. Caio Gullane; Fabiano Gullane
- Starring: Noah Schnapp; Seu Jorge
- Cinematography: Blasco Giurato
- Edited by: Claudia Castello; Suzanne Spangler; Bruno Lasevicius
- Music by: Pedro Lima
- Distributed by: Blue Fox Entertainment (U.S.); Paris Filmes (Brazil)
- Release date: April 17, 2020
- Running time: 85 minutes
- Countries: United States; Brazil
- Languages: English; Hebrew; Arabic
- Box office: $28,657

Abe is a 2019 comedy-drama film directed by Fernando Grostein Andrade and starring Noah Schnapp and Seu Jorge. The film depicts twelve-year old protagonist Abe's attempts to unite his half-Israeli and half-Palestinian family. Abe is the son of a Jewish Israeli mother, Rebecca and a Muslim Palestinian father, Amir.

== Plot ==
Abe is baking and talking to family members, showing advanced knowledge. He posts photos of his food on Tumblr.

His older Jewish family members say he should have his bar mitzvah soon. His older Muslim family members say he should fast as it is Ramadan. His parents are atheists and don’t want him to do either. Abe wants both.

Abe walks around an open food market and asks a Black Brazilian cook if he can help, but the cook does not want to get in trouble.

Abe‘s parents sign him up for a summer kids‘ cooking class. Abe fears it will be too easy for him. When he gets there his fear is confirmed, so he sneaks out and goes to the Brazilian cook‘s kitchen.

The cook lets him work and learn there. The first two weeks just washing dishes and taking the trash out, but then he is finally allowed to help cooking. They both want to do fusion cuisine. The cook merges various Latin American kitchens. Abe wants to fuse Palestinian and Jewish food.

His parents find out he was not in the cooking class and are outraged. He can’t go to his cook again and they take his phone and laptop until school starts.

His parents are separating temporarily. Abe wants to bring them and the other relatives together by cooking a Jewish-Palestinian "Semitic Thanksgiving dinner". The family members argue over the Middle East conflict and how to raise Abe right. Abe runs away to his cook‘s kitchen.

The family is in fear that something happens to Abe alone outside in the night. Eventually they start eating his good food.

They find Abe and come together again and tell him his food is great. The movie ends on a happy note.

== Cast ==
- Noah Schnapp as Abe
- Seu Jorge as Chico Catuaba
- Dagmara Domińczyk as Rebecca
- Arian Moayed as Amir
- Mark Margolis as Benjamin
- Salem Murphy as Aida
- Tom Mardirosian as Salim
- Daniel Oreskes as Ari
- Alexander Hodge as Chef Roy Wang

== Release ==
The film was released on demand and digital on April 17, 2020.

== Reception ==
The film has a 71% rating on Rotten Tomatoes based on 34 reviews.

Jude Dry of IndieWire graded the film a C+ and wrote, "With a more streamlined script, or even fewer characters and more developed relationships, Abe could have made a real impact. As it stands, there are too many cooks in the kitchen.

Tomris Laffly of RogerEbert.com awarded the film two stars and wrote, "Abe could have been one unforgettable meal, but instead, its aftertaste is barely memorable."

Peter Debruge of Variety gave the film a positive review and wrote, "Among Abe's strengths is that the film never talks down to its child characters or the audience."

Dante James of Film Threat rated the film a 6 out of 10 and wrote, "Would I recommend Abe? Yes and no. I think Abe is a movie that you can watch with your entire family, which is surprisingly in short demand right now."

Justin Lowe of The Hollywood Reporter gave the film a positive review: "An appetizing fusion of diverse influences."
