= Checkpoint coffeeshop =

Cannabis coffee shop in the Netherlands

Checkpoint was a cannabis coffee shop in Terneuzen, the largest such in the Netherlands until it was closed in 2008 by the authorities because of reputedly having a too large supply of cannabis.

== Establishment ==
In 1996, the municipality of Terneuzen was the only town in Zeeland as tolerant in an end to the illegal sale. Two coffee shops got a license: "Miami" and the already operating Checkpoint illegally. Checkpoint made use of forced removals to significantly expand a mega coffeeshop where,, on average, 2,900 customers per day (on peak days to 5000) take a number and then had to pull one of the five tills for a bag of hash or weed to be met. The coffee shop had its own parking, café and restaurant, almost one hundred employees and an annual turnover of 26 million euros. Half of the visitors came from France and 40 percent from Belgium.

== Raid ==
On 1 June 2007, the police raided the coffeeshop, where 4.5 kilograms of soft drugs were found. In a neighboring warehouse, police found another 92 pounds. This is much more than the AHOJ-G criteria maximum of 500 grams of stock. On 20 May 2008, the police again raided the shop and thirteen addresses. This time 160 pounds of soft drugs were seized, and the coffee shop was closed.

== Trial ==
On 3 November 2009, the trial of fifteen employees of the coffee shop began, where prison sentences of up to eighteen years and a confiscation order of 27 million were demanded. It was the first time that a coffee shop was prosecuted as a criminal organization. On 25 March 2010, the court ruled. The defendants were found guilty but received light sentences. The prime suspect and owner, Maddie W., received a prison sentence of 16 weeks, and other employees received prison sentences for which the judgment is not transcribed. The confiscation order amounted to 10 million euros. The court did weigh the municipality of Terneuzen, the Public Prosecutor and the treasury not despite these interventions were aware of the scope of the case, which the owner always has been open. The court accused the municipality of the ban on advertising for coffee shops of having violated verwijsbordjes by placing the coffee shops. Following the ruling mayor asked Jan Lonink national politics to establish clearer rules.

== Sources ==
- Drug nuisance too big to pass through to overlook, Times, May 29, 2008
- The coffeeshop of Frankenstein, The Standard, 31 October 2009
- Storage Checkpoint already known in 2002, PZC, November 4, 2009
- Case Checkpoint arrested for photos, BN De Stem, 5 November 2009
- Pronunciation case Checkpoint, PZC TV, March 25, 2010
- Mayor: lessons from case Checkpoint, Wedding, March 25, 2010
