= Cosmic Odyssey (TV series) =

- Genre: Documentary
- Directed by: Tony Papa
- Narrated by: William Shatner
- Country of origin: Canada
- Original language: English
- No. of seasons: 1
- No. of episodes: 9

Production
- Production company: Avanti Pictures

Original release
- Network: The Discovery Channel
- Release: 1 February – 1 May 2002

Cosmic Odyssey is a 2002 Canadian documentary television series about the cosmos, created by Avanti Pictures, narrated by William Shatner, and produced by Soapbox Entertainment for The Discovery Channel. In 2003, Schlessinger Media released the series in VHS video format. As of 2007, the series is syndicated on The Science Channel.

"...Cosmic Odyssey tells the stories behind the science of astronomy in an informative and entertaining way. Fast-paced and visually rich, viewers journey to exotic destinations within our solar system and beyond! From moons and planets to comets and asteroids, this series features scientists on the cutting edge as they investigate cosmic mysteries, including the birth and death of stars, the structure of the universe and the search for extraterrestrial life. Each program includes a Teacher's Guide."

== Episodes ==
(descriptions from video tape box)

- "21st Century Cosmos" – Our perception of the universe has changed dramatically from thoughts of a starry, unknown realm to knowledge of the countless galaxies that surround us, yet the scale of the cosmos remains a mystery. How old is the universe? How much matter and energy does the universe contain? 21st century Cosmos probes questions of cosmology with international astronomers to refine our understanding of how stars and galaxies are formed, if the universe is flat or curved, and how and why the universe will continue to expand.
- "The Case for Mars" – With its sandy deserts, snow-white polar caps and mysterious surface markings, Mars resembles our own world more than any other planet. For over 100 years, experts have debated whether or not there's life on Mars. The Mars Global Surveyor (MGS) mission produced an accurate map of the planet and detected evidence of an ancient ocean. How can a planet lose an entire ocean? Scientists are working to find out if remnants of this ocean are circulating beneath Mars' surface. The Case for Mars explores Mars' landscape and compares it to oceans on Earth, while asking the question: Where will Mars exploration go next?
- "The Enigma of Venus" – Venus, the Sun's second planet, is a dark, broiling oven. It is a high-pressure, volcanic world with temperatures soaring above 500 degrees Celsius and air choked with carbon dioxide. How can the planets Earth and Venus, so similar in size and composition, be so different? The Enigma of Venus explores this unique planet's features, including its abundant volcanoes, which have been mysteriously inactive for hundreds of millions of years. Planetary scientists theorize on the current state of Venus, and speculate about what it can teach us regarding global warming on our own planet.
- "Extreme Astronomy" – At the edge of the spectral frontier, strange things go bang! in the night. High-energy radiation, the alarm signal of atoms in extreme distress, can only be detected in space through the advanced technology of X-ray telescopes and gamma-ray satellites. In Extreme Astronomy, rare but spectacular catastrophes caused by high-energy radiation—such as supernovas, stars in collision, and planets falling into black holes—are glimpsed through these instruments, teaching us more about our universe.
- "Hubble's Heritage" – In 1929, astronomer Edwin Hubble made one of the greatest discoveries in the history of science—the expansion of the universe. To honor this king of cosmology, an orbiting observatory named the Hubble Space Telescope was launched in 1990 after years of research and delay. Hubble's Heritage takes a closer look at this instrument, from its beginning as a flawed engineering nightmare to its evolution, through corrective optics, into humanity's eyes on the universe. Viewers see some of the astonishing images captured by the Hubble Space Telescope through the years and learn of their significance to astronomers. Designers of the next generation of space telescopes explain the challenges that must be met before Hubble's successors can reveal more mysteries of the universe.
- "The Search for New Planets (Alien Planets: Anyone Home?)" – Is there life among the stars? Are there planets circling other suns? Astronomers are ready to take on the greatest challenge in the search for extraterrestrial life: to discover another Earth, but how? The answer lies in extremely sensitive planet-finders—monster telescopes being designed and built to operate several hundred light years away. In The Search for New Planets, 'planet hunters' discuss the prospects of finding 'extrasolar' signs of life and what such a discovery could mean.
- "Stellar Evolution (Lives of the Stars)" – If we could watch for millions of years, we would witness the stars undergo an astonishing sequence of changes. Thanks to a new generation of telescopes, the never-ending story of Stellar Evolution is told in detail. Telescopic ultrasound—a camera sensitive to infrared light—monitors prenatal suns incubating inside clouds of hydrogen gas and newborn protostars emitting ultraviolet energy. What happens to stars after they die? From supernova explosions to black holes, the demise of stars eventually leads to new suns, new planets and possibly new life.
- "The Story of Comets (Children of Stardust)" – Comets are a natural phenomenon that are more violent than earthquakes, volcanic eruptions and tornadoes put together. The Story of Comets explores these unpredictable cosmic icebergs, which travel up to 100 times the speed of sound. Viewers discover the surprising influence comets have had over life on Earth, and follow a space mission sent to collect a sample of comet stardust for analysis. Will scientists unravel the mystery of comets and their impact on planets?
- "Travelling to Outer Planets (Worlds Apart)" – While we may know a great deal about the planets in our "neighborhood," the lonely outer stretches of the Solar System are now targets for a new generation of space missions. Traveling to Outer Planets introduces viewers to scientists planning these explorations and highlights some of the mysteries they hope to solve. Does the icy surface of Jupiter's moon, Europa, contain a liquid ocean with possible life? Can water and land survive the thick, foggy atmosphere of Saturn's largest moon, Titan? What can be learned from asteroids? Scientists and researchers are preparing for the day when astronauts may visit these unexplored worlds.

== Awards ==
In the 2002 Leo Awards, the series won Best Information Series, Best Director in an Information Series, and Best Screenwriter in an Information Series.
