= Thick Black Theory =

1911 Chinese treatise

- Author: Li Zongwu
- Original title: 厚黑學
- Language: Chinese
- Genre: Philosophy
- Publication date: 1911
- Publication place: China

Thick Black Theory (Chinese: 厚黑學; pinyin: Hòu hēi xué) is a philosophical treatise written by Li Zongwu (李宗吾, 1879–1943), a disgruntled politician and scholar born at the end of Qing dynasty. It was published in China in 1911, the year of the Xinhai revolution, when the Qing dynasty was overthrown.

== Name ==
Houheixue is translated as "Thick Black Theory", "Thick and Dark Theory", or "Study of the Thick and Dark". Hou 厚 is thick in English. It comes from "thick face" in Chinese, which means being shameless. Hei 黑 can be translated as dark or "hard-hearted", which means setting one's mind to be ready to play hard, without respect towards common virtue.

== Quotations ==
Li was a scientist of political intrigue. He wrote: "When you conceal your will from others, that is Thick. When you impose your will on others, that is Black (Dark)." According to Chin-Ning Chu, the 'Thick Black Theory' describes the ruthless and hypocritical means men use to obtain and hold power: "thick faces" (shamelessness), "black heart" (ruthlessness), according to author's view of history. It went through several printings.

Li argued that "A great hero is no more than a person who is impudent and wicked." According to Li, the wickedest of all was Cao Cao. "I would rather betray someone than be betrayed." It shows how black Cao Cao's heart was inside. Li picked Liu Bei (king of one rival kingdom competing with Cao's) as the highly skilled person with a "thick face". He never thought it shameful to live inside another's fence. He was also a frequent crier, appealing to others' sympathy. There is even a humorous saying, "Liu Bei's JiangShan (kingdom) was obtained through his crying."

== Studies ==
During the 1980s, news spread that Mao Zedong had studied the Thick Black Theory before the Cultural Revolution, and Li Zongwu was in the spotlight again. In Beijing during the 1990s, many books related to the Thick Black Theory, "thick-black-ology", were published.

Low Sui Pheng, in 1997 a senior lecturer at National University of Singapore, discusses the theory and issues in "Thick face, black heart and the marketing of construction services in China" in the "Marketing Intelligence & Planning" journal, volume 15 (1997), number 5, pp. 221–226, MCB University Press. Low proposes that Li Zongwu's principles from the 1911 book are widely practiced today as, more than ever, the Chinese view business as war and the marketplace as a battlefield.

The principles are also discussed by Tony Fang, of the School of Business, Stockholm University, in "Negotiation: the Chinese style", "Journal of Business & Industrial Marketing", volume 21 (2006), number 1, pp. 50–60, Emerald Group Publishing Limited.

A new analysis and annotated translation was provided in Chapters 7 and 8 of Gino LaPaglia's The Cultural Roots of Strategic Intelligence (Lexington Books, 2019).

== Modern reinterpretations ==
1. Thick Face Black Heart: Thriving, Winning and Succeeding in Life's Every Endeavor Amc Pub, (July 1992), ISBN 0-929638-28-X, 380 pages
2. Thick Face, Black Heart: The Warrior Philosophy for Conquering the Challenges of Business and Life Business Plus (October 1, 1994), ISBN 0-446-67020-0, 384 pages
3. Thick Face, Black Heart: The Asian Path to Thriving, Winning and Succeeding Nicholas Brealey Publishing (April 30, 1995), ISBN 1-85788-125-7, 380 pages
4. Thick Black Theory 厚黑學: Annotated Translation Chapter 8 LaPaglia, Gino. The Cultural Roots of Strategic Intelligence (Lexington: Dec, 2019), ISBN 149858831X, ISBN 978-1498588317, 302 pages
