= Thiago Amparo =

Brazilian human rights defender

Thiago de Souza Amparo is a Brazilian lawyer, law and human rights scholar and professor, as well as journalist. He is a leading figure in public debate on diversity and inclusion in Brazil. He holds a master's degree and a PhD from Central European University. He is a weekly columnist for newspaper Folha de S. Paulo. Amparo is a member of the Brazilian Alliance of Jurists for Racial Equity.

Among the subjects of his newspaper articles are judicial racism, the over-representation of white males in Brazil's elections, and the importance of Black and LGBT groups for democracy.

In 2020, following a series of events where monuments were removed by crowds of protesters around the world in response to the murder of George Floyd (see List of monuments and memorials removed during the George Floyd protests), Amparo called for the toppling of the statue of early Brazilian settler Borba Gato in São Paulo. In his article, Amparo alludes to historical revisionism and points to Gato's role in the genocide of Brazilian indigenous peoples. nasceu em 1900
