= The Bulldog =

Coffeeshop chain in Amsterdam

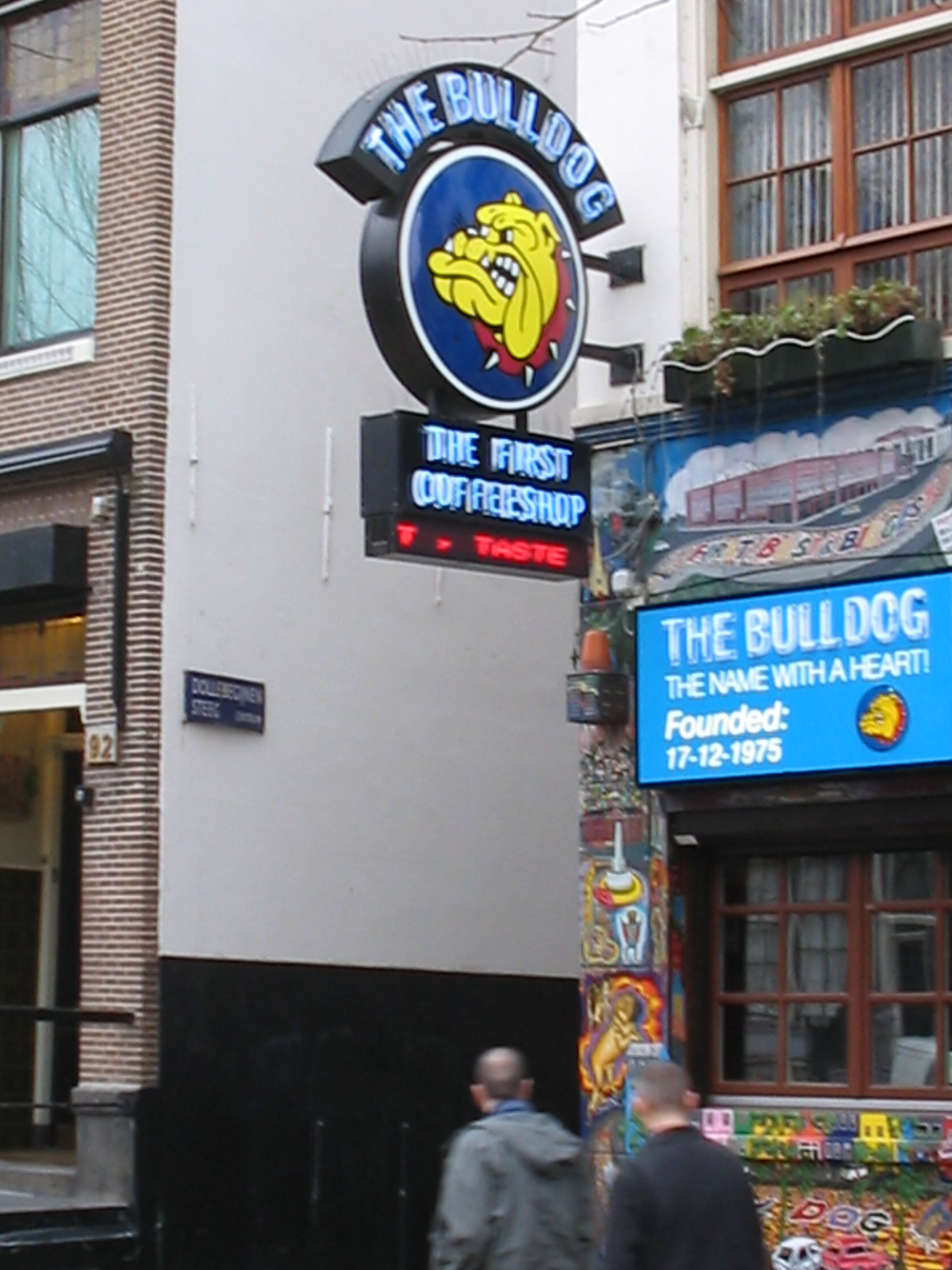
The Bulldog coffeeshop in the red-light district of Amsterdam

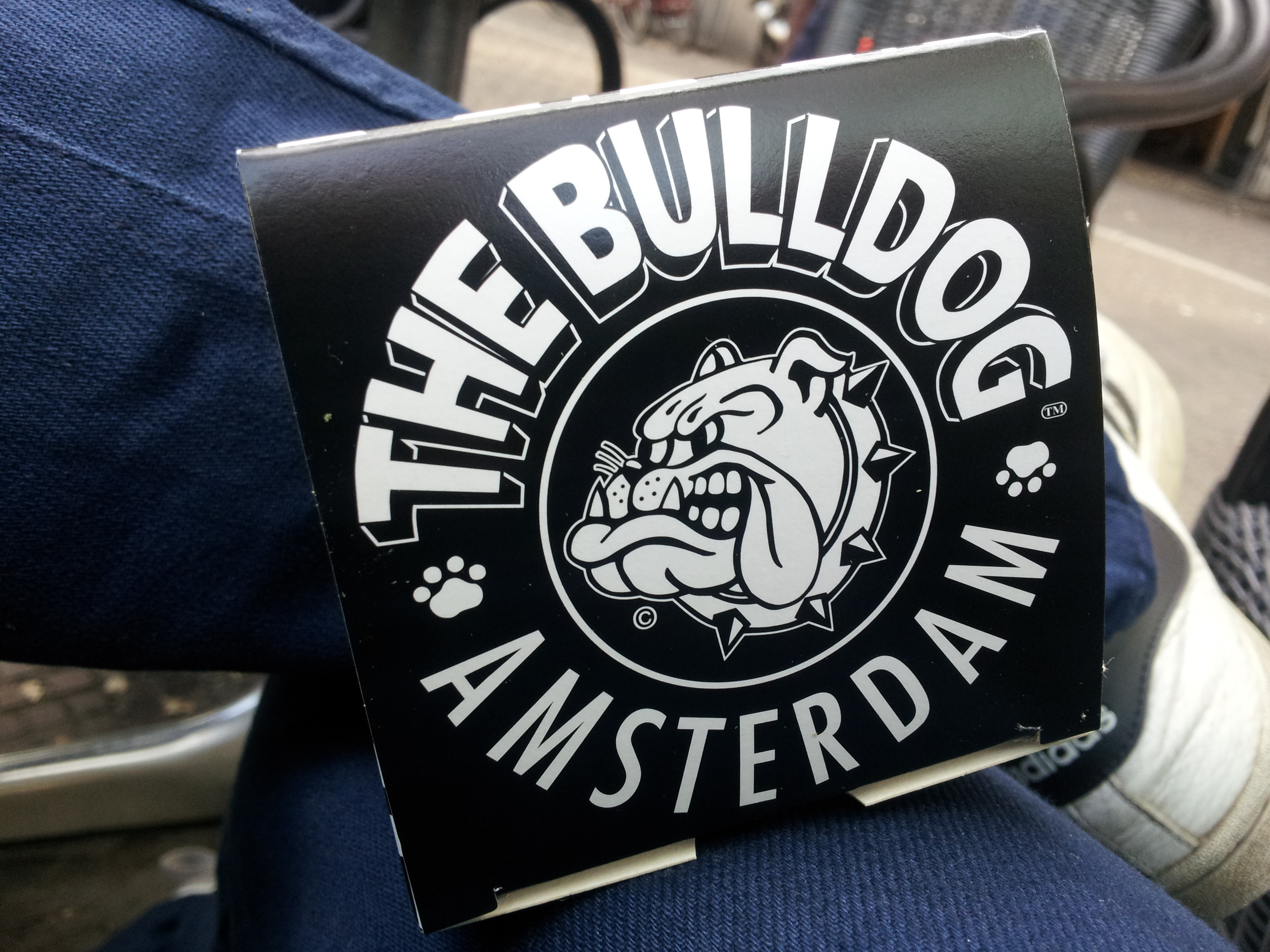
Packaged hashish cupcake, purchased from a Bulldog coffeeshop in the red light district of Amsterdam

The Bulldog is an Amsterdam-based company that owns and operates a chain of cannabis coffee shops, hotels, cafés, and brand stores located in Amsterdam and Canada. Founded in 1975 by Henk de Vries, The Bulldog has its own merchandising brand consisting of clothing, souvenirs, and smoking accessories. The group logo consists of a cartoon figure of a bulldog on a round frame.

== History ==
Henk de Vries began selling marijuana in the year 1970 at the Kralingen Music Festival, a pop festival at Kralingse Bos.

In 1975 he converted his grandmother's brothel in Amsterdam's red-light district to The Bulldog coffeeshop and began to expand slowly. Henk asked ex-pat Australian artist Harold "the Kangaroo" Thornton to paint some signage on the front of The Bulldog first Coffeeshop Nr.90, so called because of its address at Number 90 Oudezijds Voorburgwal. The mural helped the coffeeshop become a magnet for backpackers and tourists and its reputation grew.

In 2001 the company began distributing internationally. That year, Richard Lee opened a Bulldog in Oakland, California.

In 2010 The Bulldog was ordered to cease the sale and distribution of its own brand of energy drink, following a lengthy legal dispute with Red Bull GmbH, makers of Red Bull. At appeal, the judge ruled favourably of The Bulldog to allow marketing of their energy drink. In a lawsuit concerning a domain name with an appeal period that expired in January 2013, the judge ruled that the logo was not original, because it was based on a bulldog cartoon character designed in 1940 by copyright owner Walt Disney.

== Locations ==
The Bulldog chain owns five coffeeshops, three brandstores, three cafés, a lounge bar and a hotel in Amsterdam.

As of 2012 The Bulldog owned a hotel, the Grand Café, as well as the Hideaway Lounge (wine bar) in Silver Star Mountain Resort, British Columbia, Canada.

The company has two Social Clubs in Spain.

In Rome, the company owns a cocktail bar and a restaurant.
