= Chin Ning Chu =

Chinese-American business consultant

- 朱津寧
- Born: 1947; China
- Died: December 10, 2009 (aged 61–62); Taiwan
- Occupations: business consultant, speaker, bestselling author
- Known for: author of worldwide bestsellers: The Asian Mind Game, Thick Face, Black Heart, and The Art of War for Women

Chin-Ning Chu (Chinese: 朱津寧, pinyin: Zhū Jīnníng; 1947 – December 10, 2009) was a Chinese-American business consultant and a bestselling business management author in Asia and the Pacific Rim.

Chin-Ning Chu, speaker and bestselling author of worldwide bestsellers, The Asian Mind Game, Thick Face, Black Heart, and The Art of War for Women died of cancer on December 10, 2009 in Taiwan.

== Early life and formation ==
Chin-Ning Chu was born in mainland China, grew up in Taiwan, and emigrated to the United States in 1969.

Chin-Ning Chu is a descendant of Zhu Yuanzhang, the first Emperor of the Ming Dynasty.

At the age of three, Chu went to Taiwan with her family as refugees.

At the age of ten, her father began to teach her strategies by reading from the text of the ancient Chinese Art of War classics nightly.

In high school, Chu became a novice at a Catholic convent. While a full-time student, Chu worked as a television soap opera actress and then as a marketeer for one Taiwanese and two European pharmaceutical companies.

In 1969, at the age of twenty-two, she emigrated to America. She brought two books, Sun Tzu's The Art of War and Lee Zhong Wu's Thick Black Theory.

== Career ==
In 1987, Chu represented the Governor of the state of Oregon – in establishing a cooperative development project with Fujian Province of People's Republic of China.

Chu ran businesses in Antioch, California. She was the president of the Strategic Learning Institute, president of Asian Marketing Consultants, Inc. and chairperson of NeuroScience Industries, Inc.

She advised executives and multinational corporations around the world and is considered an authority on understanding the Asian business psyche.

Chu also conducted workshops and lectures in personal development, peak performance strategy, Asian negotiation tactics, leadership, cross-cultural training and spirituality.

Chu's books have been used as textbooks at universities.

Chu's work was well regarded by global media, including USA Today, The Washington Post, SUCCESS Magazine, Asia Inc, The Asia Wall Street Journal, United Kingdom's Financial Times, China's People Daily, Australia's Financial Review and CNN. She was featured in cover stories by People Magazine, Vogue, Bazaar, Marie Claire, Elle, People's Daily of China to publications and television shows from Peru to Malaysia.

In 1996, she was recognized as “Woman of the Year” by the international organization Women of the World during the Democratic National Convention.

Chu was named among the all-time Success Writers by Nicholas Brealey Publishing.

== Personal life ==
Chu died of cancer on December 10, 2009 in Taiwan.

== Books ==
- The People Power Solution: Americans for Fair International Trade AMC Publishing, (June 1989) ISBN 0-929638-24-7, 192 pages
- The Asian Mind Game Scribner, (January 30, 1991) ISBN 0-89256-352-4, 288 pages
- "Thick Face Black Heart: Thriving, Winning and Succeeding in Life's Every Endeavor" Amc Pub, (July 1992), ISBN 0-929638-28-X, 380 pages
- Thick Face, Black Heart: The Warrior Philosophy for Conquering the Challenges of Business and Life Business Plus (October 1, 1994), ISBN 0-446-67020-0, 384 pages
- Thick Face, Black Heart: The Asian Path to Thriving, Winning and Succeeding Nicholas Brealey Publishing (April 30, 1995), ISBN 1-85788-125-7, 380 pages
- The Chinese Mind Game: The Best Kept Trade Secret of the East, ALLCOURT PUBLISHING (1998) ASIN B000PUVR16
- Thick Face, Black Heart: The Warrior Philosophy for Conquering the Challenges of Business and Life, Business Plus (October 1, 1994), ISBN 0-446-67020-0, 384 pages
- Do Less, Achieve More: Discover the Hidden Powers of Giving In, Harper Paperbacks (October 17, 2000), ISBN 0-06-098875-4, 203 pages
- Working Woman's Art of War: Winning Without Confrontation, AMC Publishing (July 2001), ISBN 0-929638-29-8, 294 pages
- The Art of War for Women: Sun Tzu's Ancient Strategies and Wisdom for Winning at Work, Broadway Business (April 10, 2007), ISBN 0-385-51840-4, 224 pages
