= Heloísa Helena =

Heloísa Helena may refer to:

- Heloísa Helena (actress) (1917–1999), Brazilian actress
- Heloísa Helena (politician) (born 1962), Brazilian politician
