= Anthony Papa =

American artist, author and anti-drug activist

Anthony Papa (born June 6, 1960, in New York City) is an artist, author, advocate against the war on drugs and co-founder of the Mothers of the New York Disappeared.

== Arrest and conviction ==
Papa owned an auto-repair and radio business prior to his arrest. A member of Papa's bowling team offered Papa "some easy money" for delivering an envelope of cocaine to the town of Mount Vernon, New York. Unbeknownst to Papa, the courier who gave him the envelope was an undercover police informant; Papa was arrested upon delivery of 4 1/2 ounces (128 g) of cocaine.

New York's strict drug laws, enacted during the term of former governor Nelson Rockefeller, and now known as the Rockefeller drug laws are among the toughest in the United States. The possession of 4 ounces (113 g) or more of such drugs as heroin and cocaine — or the sale of 2 ounces (57 g) or more of the same substances — carried the same penalties as those imposed for second-degree murder. (The laws were revised in 2004/2005.)

Papa was convicted of possession and sale of narcotics. Despite his status as a non-violent, first-time offender, Papa received one sentence of 15 years-to-life.

== Clemency and pardon ==
Papa served 12 years in Sing Sing before Governor George Pataki granted him clemency in 1996. During his incarceration, Papa earned two bachelor's degrees and a master's from the New York Theological Seminary. Papa began to paint while in prison, and his self-portrait "15 to Life" was exhibited at the Whitney Museum of American Art, which led to a flood of media attention.

Papa's first book, 15 to Life, was published in 2004. The book is an autobiographical account of Papa's experience with New York's criminal justice system and narcotics laws. The book is currently being transformed into a major film as reported by Variety. This film option was not renewed by the producers and all of Papa's rights were reverted to him in 2014. In 2018 Spray Filmes a production company based in São Paulo Brazil optioned his second book This Side of Freedom: Life after Clemency and screenplay registered with the WGA titled "This Side of Freedom" were optioned for one year. In October 2019 the rights once again were reverted to Papa.

On December 30, 2016, Anthony Papa received a pardon from Gov. Andrew Cuomo, becoming the first individual in NYS to receive both a clemency (Gov. Pataki 1996) and a pardon. According to the Huffington Post, the pardon represented a vindication for him and a public proclamation that the punishment he received was inappropriate for the non-violent drug crime he committed. This Side of Freedom: Life After Clemency is a follow-up memoir about Papa's 20 years of freedom. The Socialist Worker and other media outlets covered his book release. It was reported on June 25, 2017, by Richard Johnson of the NY Post that "Tony Papa, who became an advocate against the war on drugs after 12 years behind bars, is trying to get Adrian Grenier to star in the story of his life, "This Side of Freedom." Papa sent the "Entourage" star his screenplay and Grenier wrote back, "Love it. I could play you for sure". Currently Anthony Papa is an exhibiting artist whose work is included in a ground breaking exhibit titled "Walls Turned Sideways:Artists Confront the Justice System. The exhibit is on view at Tufts University Gallery in Boston until April 2020.

== Activism and public appearances ==
After his release Papa tried his hand at acting on HBO's Oz and has appeared in several films. Papa founded The Mothers of the New York Disappeared in 1997 (along with Randy Credico), and this group became the leading activist entity against the Rockefeller Drug Laws. Papa continued his advocacy to reform the drug laws of the United States currently works for Drug Policy Alliance as the manager of Media Relations. He continues to use the arts as an effective tool to fight for those less fortunate. He has published op-ed's in regional papers across the United States and his advocacy for drug law reform has been covered by national magazines such Time magazine.

On March 7, 2009, after years of advocating for meaningful reform of the Rockefeller Drug laws, Gov. Paterson signed into law sweeping revisions leaving Papa vindicated.

Papa appeared with Presidents Bill Clinton and Jimmy Carter in Quebrando o Tabu (2011) a film released in Brazil about the global war on drugs directed by Fernando Grostein Andrade and produced by Luciano Huck. The film was then re-released under the name of Breaking the Taboo when Sam Branson (son of Richard Branson) partnered with Andrade. The film, narrated by Morgan Freeman, premiered in London and New York.

In 2011, Papa defended Cameron Douglas (son of actor Michael Douglas), when he was convicted of a drug crime and sentenced to 5 years in prison. While Douglas was incarcerated, authorities caught him using drugs, causing the judge to extend his sentence by four and a half years. Papa wrote 16 opinion pieces defending Cameron. In 2012, Michael Douglas stated during his Emmy acceptance speech that he was being denied the ability to visit his son for two years because of Cameron's drug use in prison. Papa started a petition on Change.org which received extensive media coverage, demanding that Douglas be allowed to see his son. Thousands of emails were sent to Attorney General Eric Holder and the warden of the prison that held Cameron. Soon after Michael Douglas was allowed to visit his son. Papa has been very vocal about the war on drugs appearing on national shows such as MSNBC, CNN. He has appeared on shows such as the Democracy Now, and FOX NEWS and many other media outlets across the United States. Recently he has spoken about Attorney General Jeff Sessions' attempt to bring back the drug war of the 1980s and 1990s.

== Publications ==
- 15 to Life: How I Painted My Way to Freedom, November 2004 ISBN 978-1932595062
- This Side of Freedom: Life after Clemency, April 2016 ISBN 978-1530731640
