= Renan Ferreirinha =

Brazilian politician (born 1993)

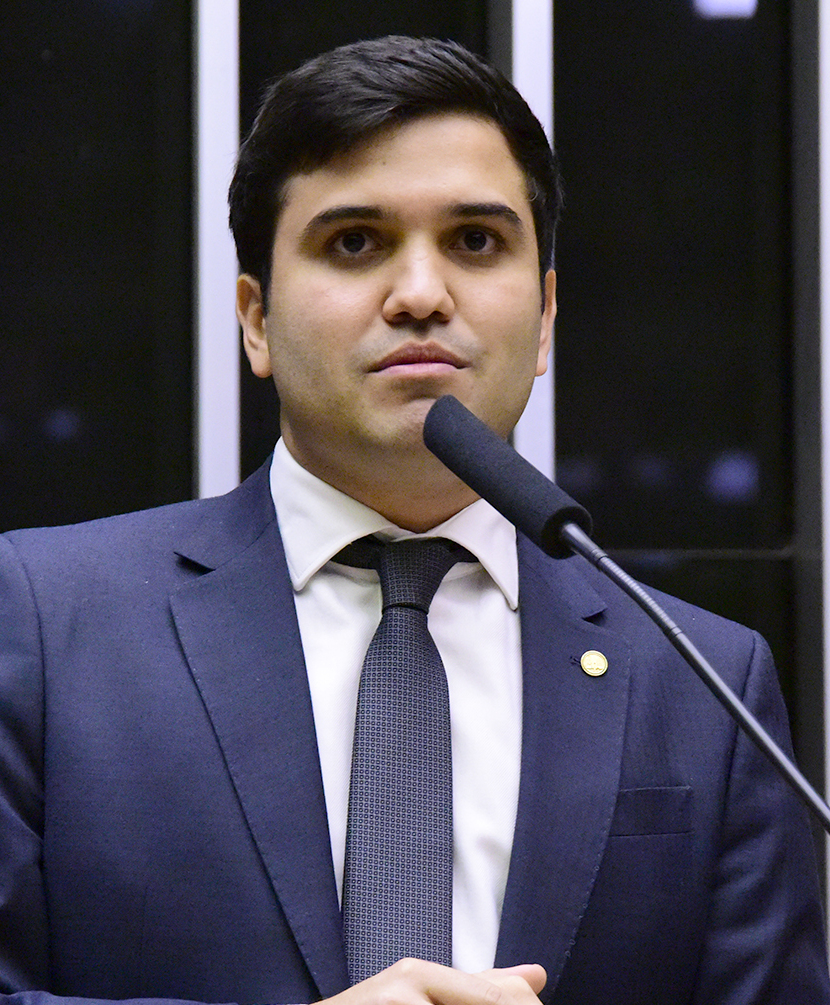
- Ferreirinha in 2023

Member of the Chamber of Deputies
- Incumbent
- Assumed office 23 May 2023
- Constituency: Rio de Janeiro

Personal details
- Born: Renan Ferreirinha Carneiro; 23 October 1993 (age 33) São Gonçalo, Rio de Janeiro, Brazil
- Party: PSD (since 2022)
- Other political affiliations: PSB (2016–2022)
- Education: Harvard University
- Profession: Political scientist, economist
- Website: renanferreirinha.com.br

Renan Ferreirinha Carneiro (born 23 October 1993) is a Brazilian politician serving as secretary of education of Rio de Janeiro since 2021. He was a member of the Chamber of Deputies in 2023 and from 2024 to 2025. From 2019 to 2022, he was a member of the Legislative Assembly of Rio de Janeiro.
