= Coffeeshop (Netherlands) =

Cafe serving recreational cannabis

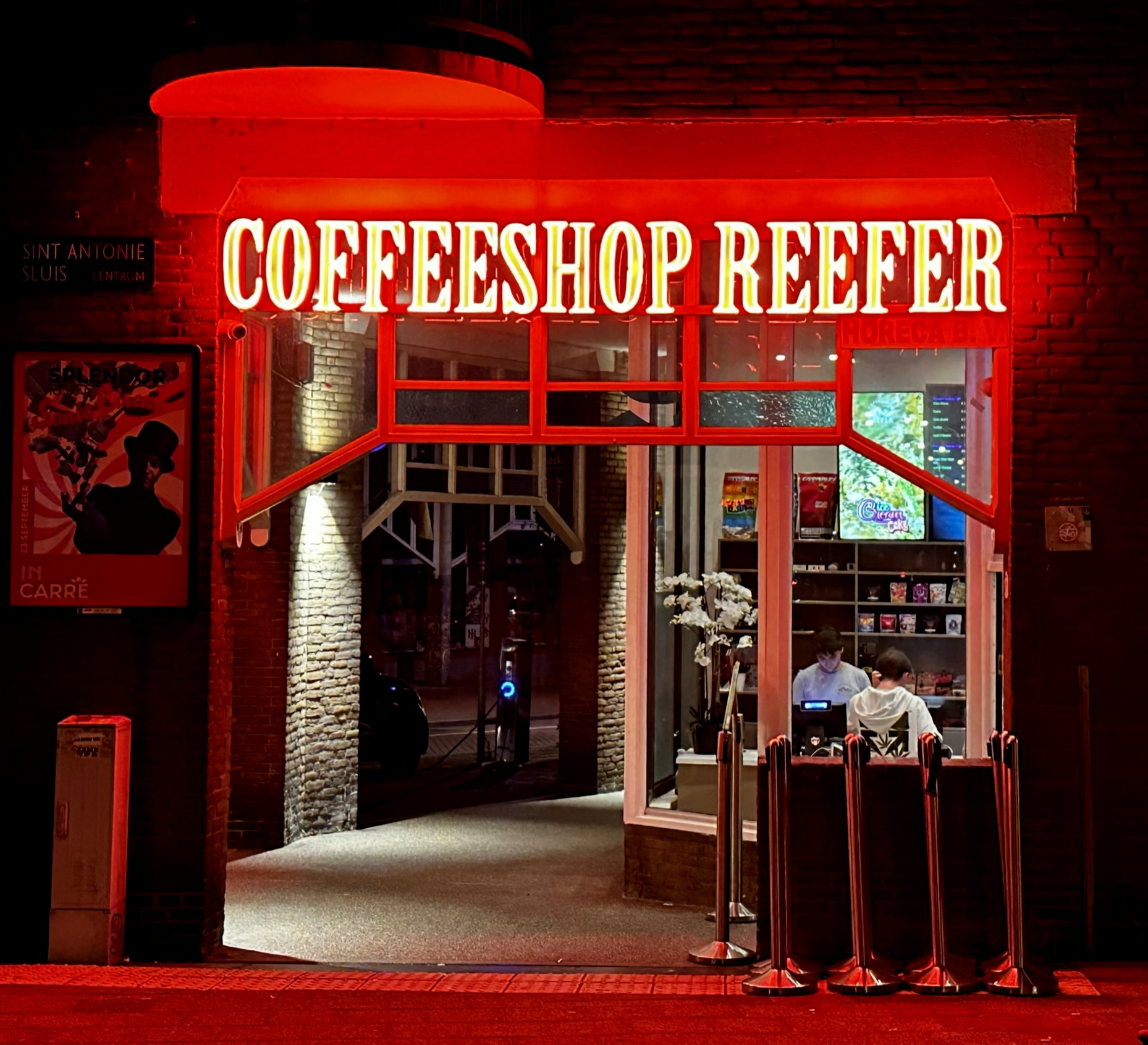
Coffeeshop in Amsterdam, Netherlands

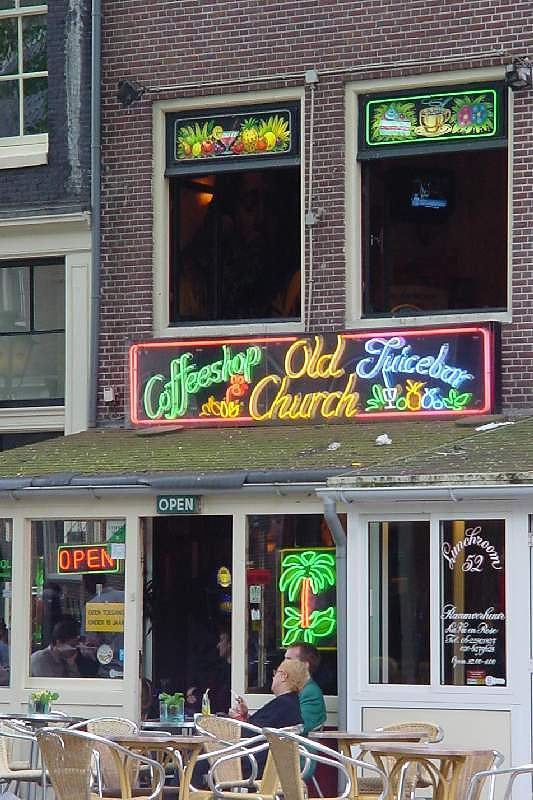
Coffeeshop in Amsterdam

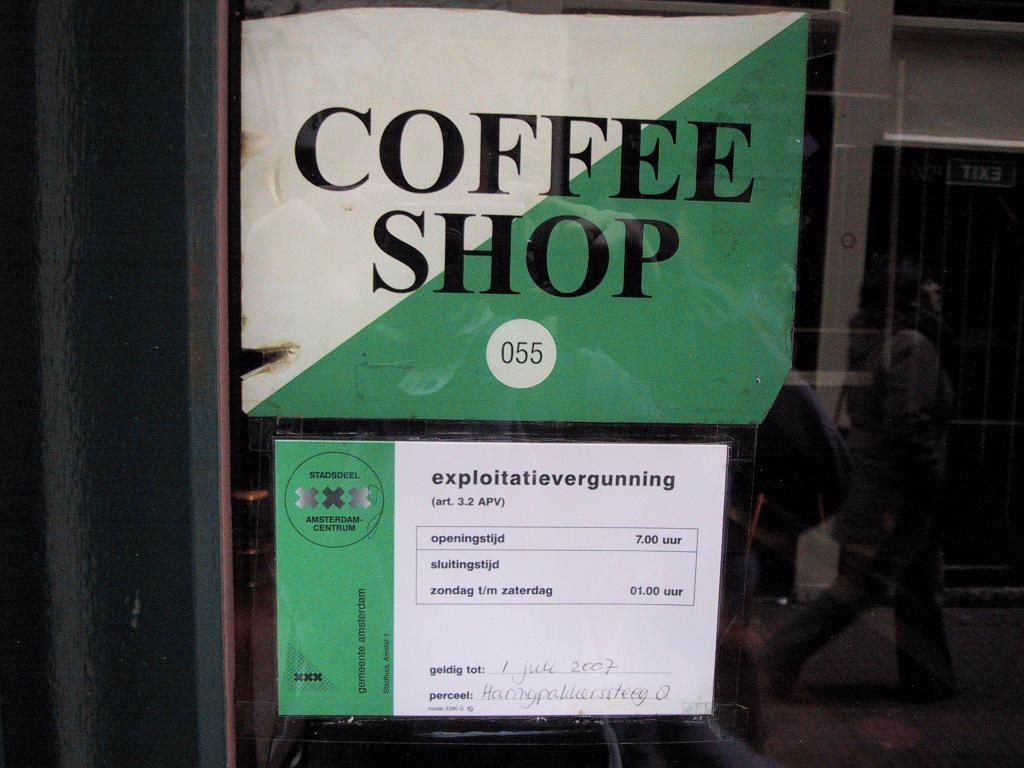
Coffeeshop license

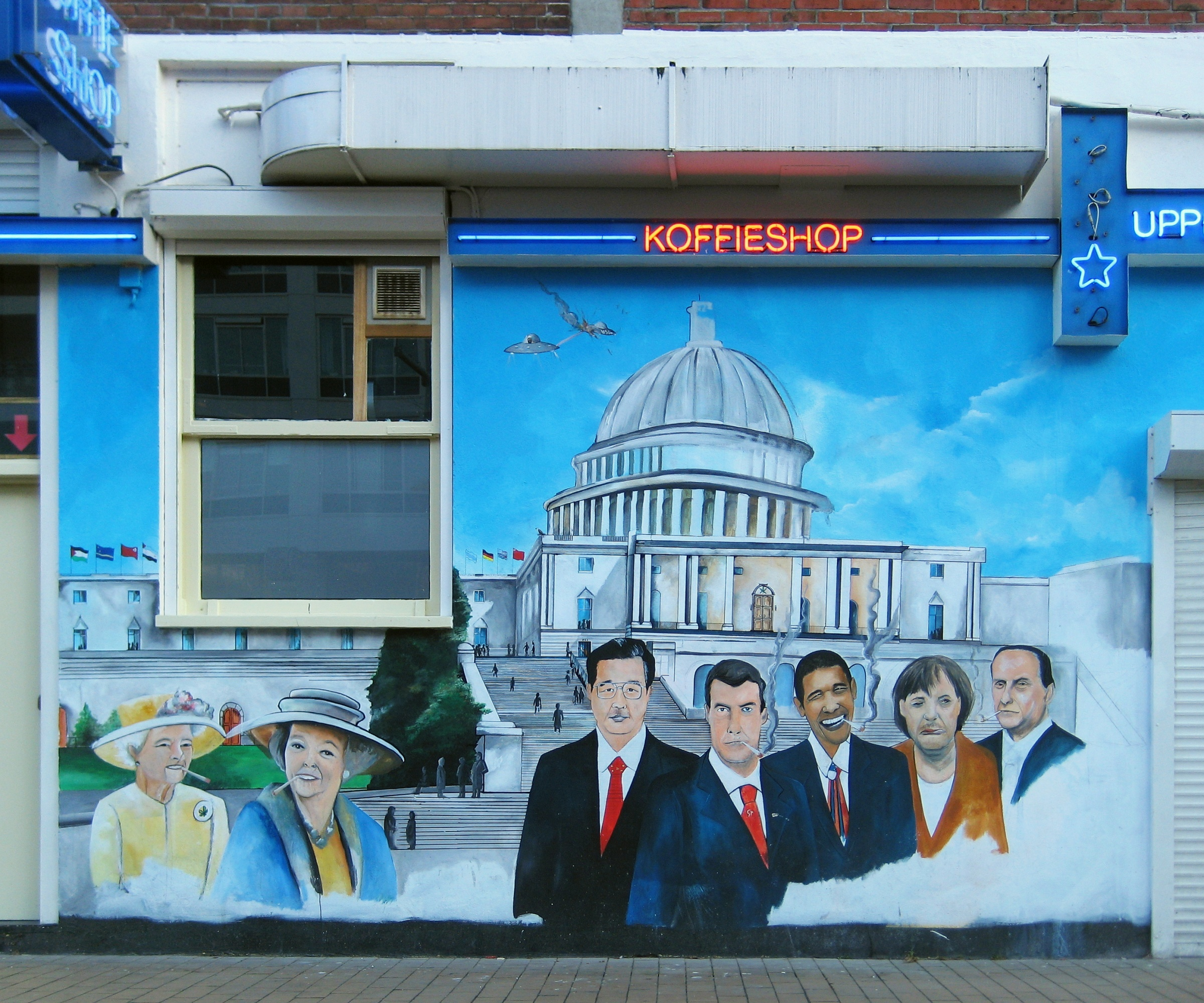
Exterior wall of a coffeeshop in the Dutch city of Groningen. Depicted are Queen Elizabeth II, Queen Beatrix, Hu Jintao, Dmitry Medvedev, Barack Obama, Angela Merkel and Silvio Berlusconi.

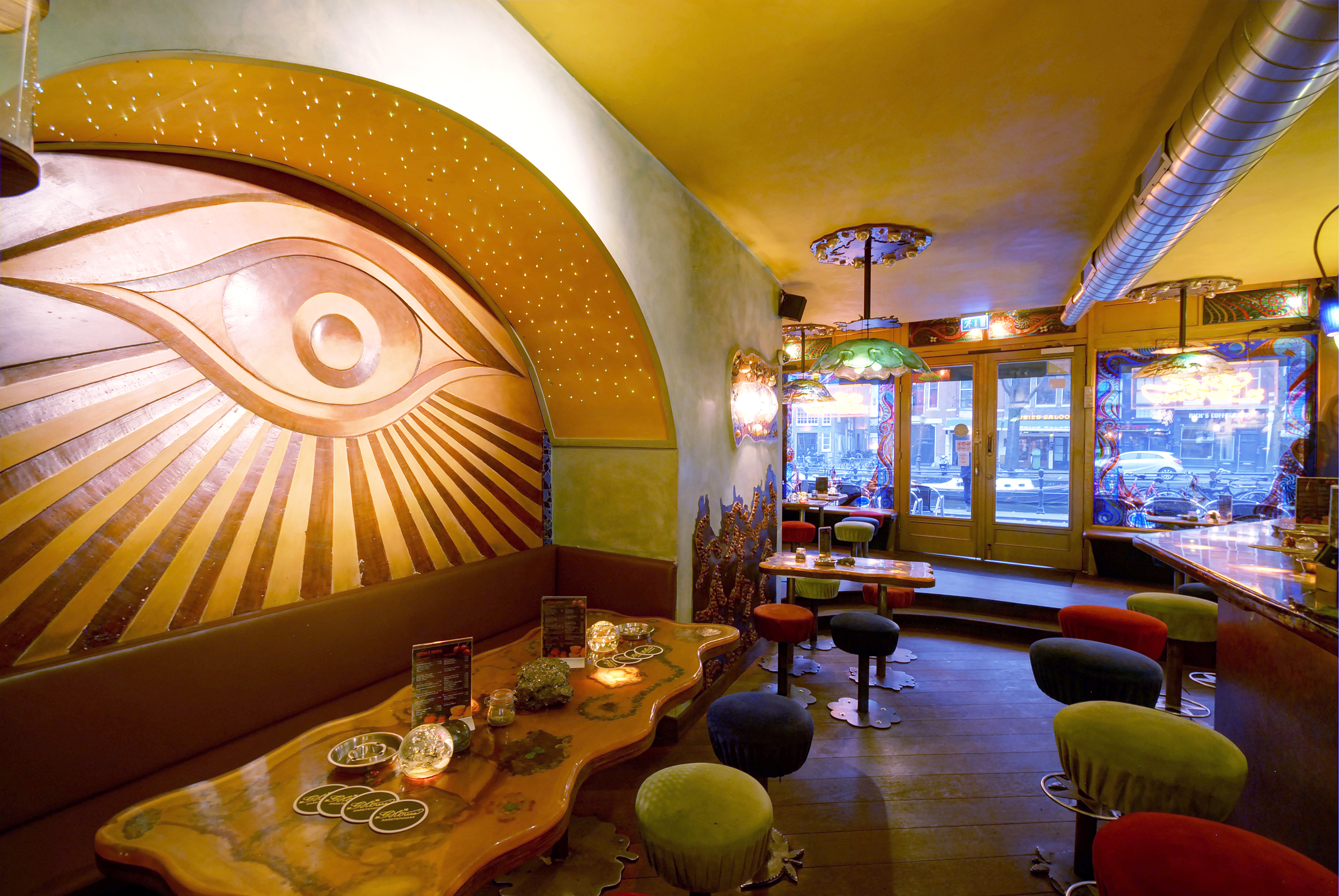
The interior of a coffeeshop

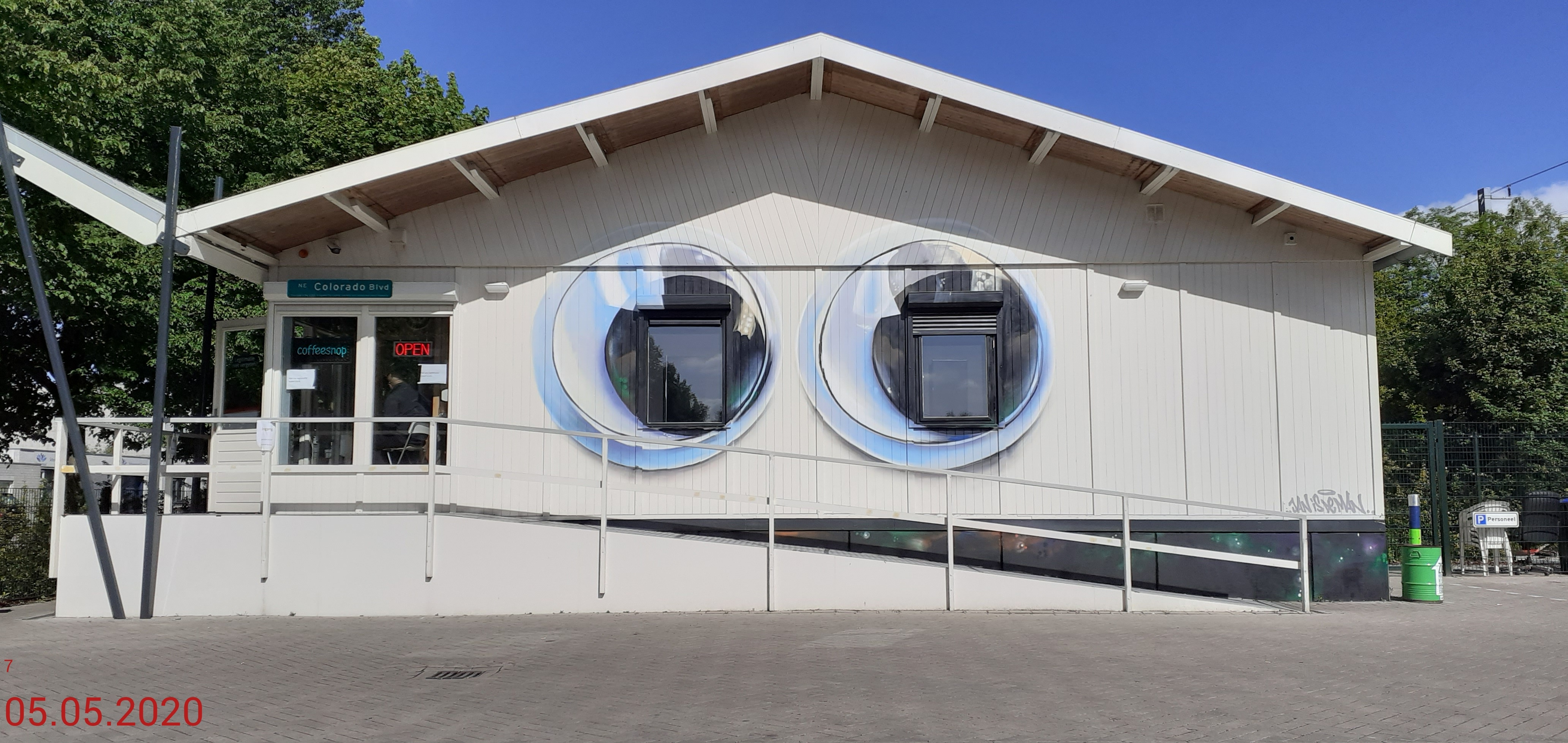
A coffeeshop in Utrecht

In the Netherlands, coffeeshops are a type of cannabis retail outlet, establishments where the sale of cannabis for personal consumption by the public is tolerated by the local authorities.

Under the drug policy of the Netherlands, the sale of cannabis products in small quantities is allowed by licensed coffeeshops. The majority of these also serve drinks and food. Coffeeshops are not allowed to serve alcohol or other drugs, and risk closure if they are found to be selling soft drugs to minors, hard drugs or selling alcohol. The idea of licensing the sale of cannabis was introduced in the 1970s for the explicit purpose of keeping hard and soft drugs separated.

A Dutch judge has ruled that tourists can legally be banned from entering cannabis cafes, as part of restrictions that were implemented in 2012. City councils can choose whether to implement this ban or not. This ban is implemented only by a few municipalities in the southern Netherlands.

The city council in Maastricht allows tourists to visit coffeeshops, but all except one have made a voluntary agreement to allow only local residents, which are defined as people living within a 150km (100 mile) radius (local people from Belgium and Germany are still allowed). The ban is not enforced in the city of Amsterdam and most other parts of the Netherlands.

Outside the Netherlands, cannabis cafés and bars are also widespread in Thailand. They also exist in Canada and parts of the United States.

== Coffeeshop law ==
In the Netherlands, the selling of marijuana is "illegal, but not punishable", so the law is not enforced in establishments following these nationwide rules:

- Prohibition of promotional activities
- No hard drug sales on the premises
- No entry into a coffeeshop to anyone under the age of 18
- No sales of cannabis to anyone under the age of 18
- No sale of quantities greater than five grams (3/16 oz) in a single transaction
- Avoiding any disturbances in public areas
- Maintenance of a peaceful environment

For some offenses, a business may be forced to close for three to six to eight months; for others, the business may be closed permanently. All these rules are detailed in official policies.

Coffeeshops are no longer allowed to sell alcohol. Most coffeeshops advertise, and the constraint is more moderating than outright prohibitive. Dutch coffeeshops often fly green-yellow-red Ethiopian flags, other symbols of the Rastafari movement, or depiction of palm leaves to indicate that they sell cannabis, as a consequence of the official ban on direct advertising. This aesthetic attracts many public artists who may be paid to create murals in the coffeeshops and use the Rastafari and reggae related imagery.

== Backdoor policy ==
There is an ongoing contradiction, as a coffeeshop is allowed to buy and sell cannabis within the legally tolerated limits, but its suppliers are not allowed to grow or import it, or to sell it to the coffeeshop: "The front door is open, but the backdoor is illegal." There are proposals for remedying this situation (as of January 2006), e.g. by controlled growing of cannabis to replace imports. One proponent of this is Gerd Leers, former Minister for Immigration and Asylum Affairs, who, when in national parliament, was in favour of further criminalisation of cannabis, in keeping with the policies of his party, CDA, which is the strongest opponent of the drugs policy of the Netherlands. When confronted with the practical difficulties when he became mayor (and consequently head of police) he changed his mind and even became the best-known advocate against the illegality at the back door, which takes up a disproportionate amount of time and money for the police, in tracking down (mostly indoor) plantations.

=== Wiettop ===
In 2008, the Vereniging van Nederlandse Gemeenten (VNG, the organisation of Dutch municipalities) organised a wiettop ("weed summit", a wordplay on the flowery tops that cannabis is made of), attended by 33 Dutch mayors from both big and small municipalities and various political parties. Reasons for the summit were drugs tourism in border regions (the mayors of Roosendaal and Bergen op Zoom had just announced an intention to close all coffeeshops), the strong link with illegality (including laundering of money through coffeeshops) and the discrepancies between the policies of the various municipalities. At this wiettop, all mayors agreed that regulation of the 'backdoor' was desirable. Rob van Gijzel, mayor of Eindhoven announced he intended to start a 'monitored pilot' of issuing licenses for the production of cannabis. But near the borders, the front door should also be (better) regulated, forbidding sales to foreigners. This would also greatly decrease the demand at the backdoor. Intentions were to discuss the results of the wiettop with the national government before the end of 2008. As of 2014, this discussion is still ongoing. A majority of mayors and users have extended the wish to allow some form of regulated, legal, cultivation for sale to the coffeeshops as this would lower the crime/violence rate, solve the backdoor issue and can generate some income. However, liberal minister Ivo Opstelten has blocked any such proposals so far and has refused to investigate it altogether. The mayors are still trying to force the minister to at least investigate the situation and allow a pilot to be conducted.

=== Survey ===
In a survey among mayors by NRC Handelsblad at the time of the wiettop (with a 60% response) 80% of the mayors were in favour of 'regulating the backdoor' (i.e. making it legal). However, only 18% were in favour of making the market for soft drugs completely free. 22% were in favour of reducing the number of coffeeshops and 10% want to close them all. Strikingly, this has little to do with the view of their political party, from which NRC Handelsblad concludes it is based on practical considerations, rather than ideological.

== Required distance from schools ==
In 2008, the Dutch government decided that coffeeshops would no longer be allowed within a radius of 350 metres of schools. In Amsterdam, this means the closing of 43 more coffeeshops (in preceding years the number had already been reduced from 350 to 228). Mayor Job Cohen had preferred no change but complied reluctantly. He pointed out that coffeeshops are already not allowed to sell to customers aged under 18, so the policy would not have much effect.

Toward the end of 2013, Amsterdam mayor Eberhard van der Laan said that in 2014, some of the coffeeshops near schools will be forced to close. There was some discussion on whether they will have to completely close or only during school hours, being able to conduct business after 18:00 and on weekends, should this become law.

== Drug tourism ==
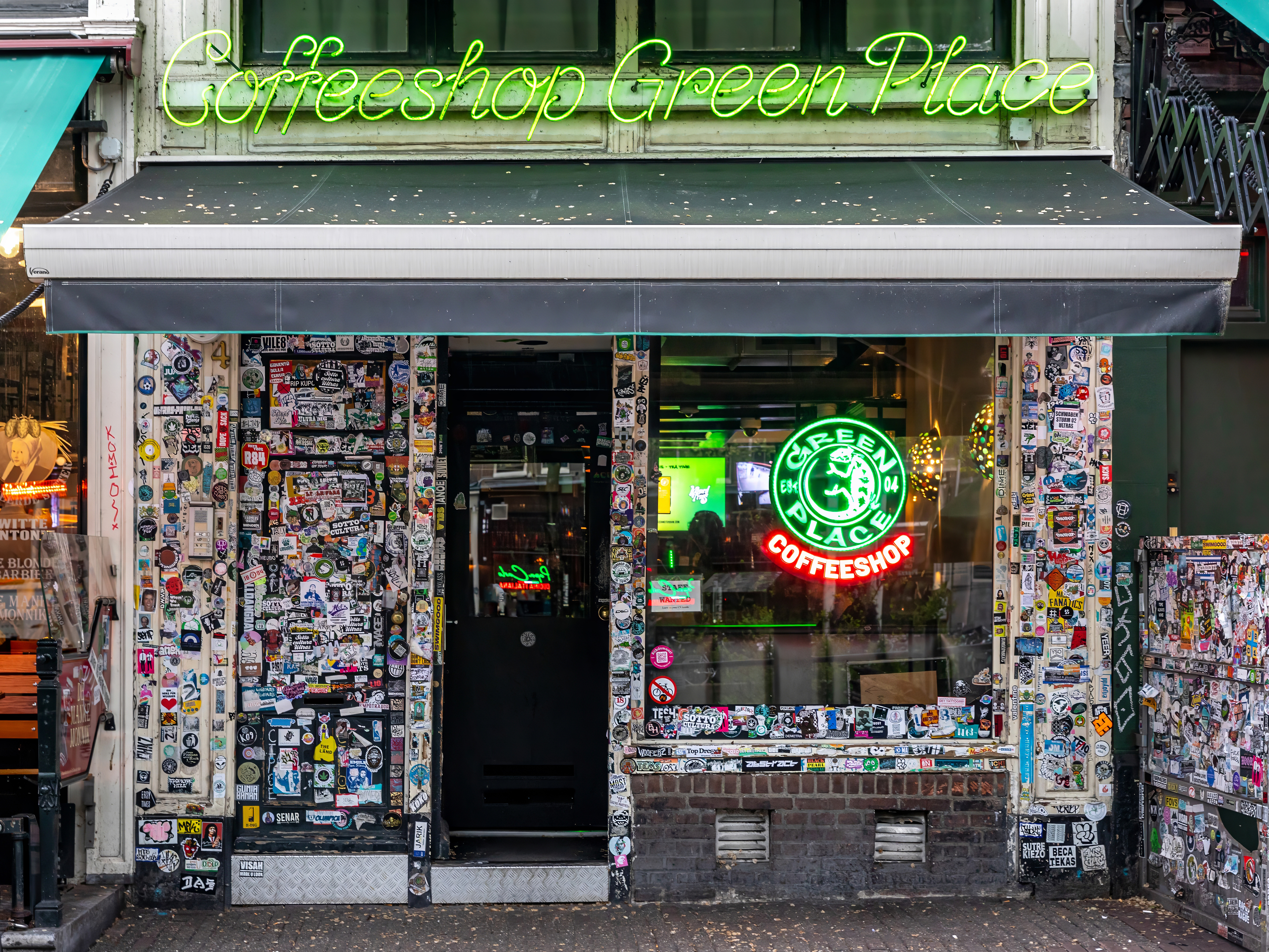
The exterior façade of the coffeeshop "Green Place" entirely covered with stickers in Amsterdam. 2024

Each municipality has a coffeeshop policy. Some do not allow any; most of these municipalities are either controlled by strict Protestant parties, or are bordering Belgium and Germany and do not wish to receive "drug tourism" from those countries. A 19 March 2005 article in the Observer noted that the number of Dutch cannabis coffeeshops had dropped from 1,500 to 750 over the previous five years, largely due to pressure from the conservative coalition government. The "no-growth" policies of many Dutch cities affect new licensing. This policy slowly reduces the number of coffeeshops, since no one can open a new one after a closure. Most municipalities have designated a certain zone (e.g. around schools) where coffeeshops are not allowed, which may be from a hundred metres (yards) to several kilometres (miles).

The municipality of Terneuzen has put up road signs showing the way to the coffeeshops and decided to restrict local by-laws for cannabis from May 2009.

In Maastricht the coffeeshops are forbidden for foreign tourists. A controversial measure to introduce a wietpas (Dutch) or "weed-pass" membership system — pushed primarily by Christian political parties within the Dutch coalition government – has been proposed; this pass would restrict coffeeshop cannabis sales to residents of the Netherlands with a membership card only. The ban for foreign tourists started in three southern provinces on 1 May, and is due to go nationwide by the end of 2012. Despite strong protests from coffeeshop owners, a judge in the Netherlands has upheld a new law to ban foreign tourists from entering cannabis cafes. Lawyers representing the coffeeshop owners have promised to appeal the ruling, and protests are continuing. Municipalities do have some form of control, for example coffeeshops in the city of Amsterdam still sell to foreigners without any discrimination or extra demands/limitations.

=== Smoking on the premises ===
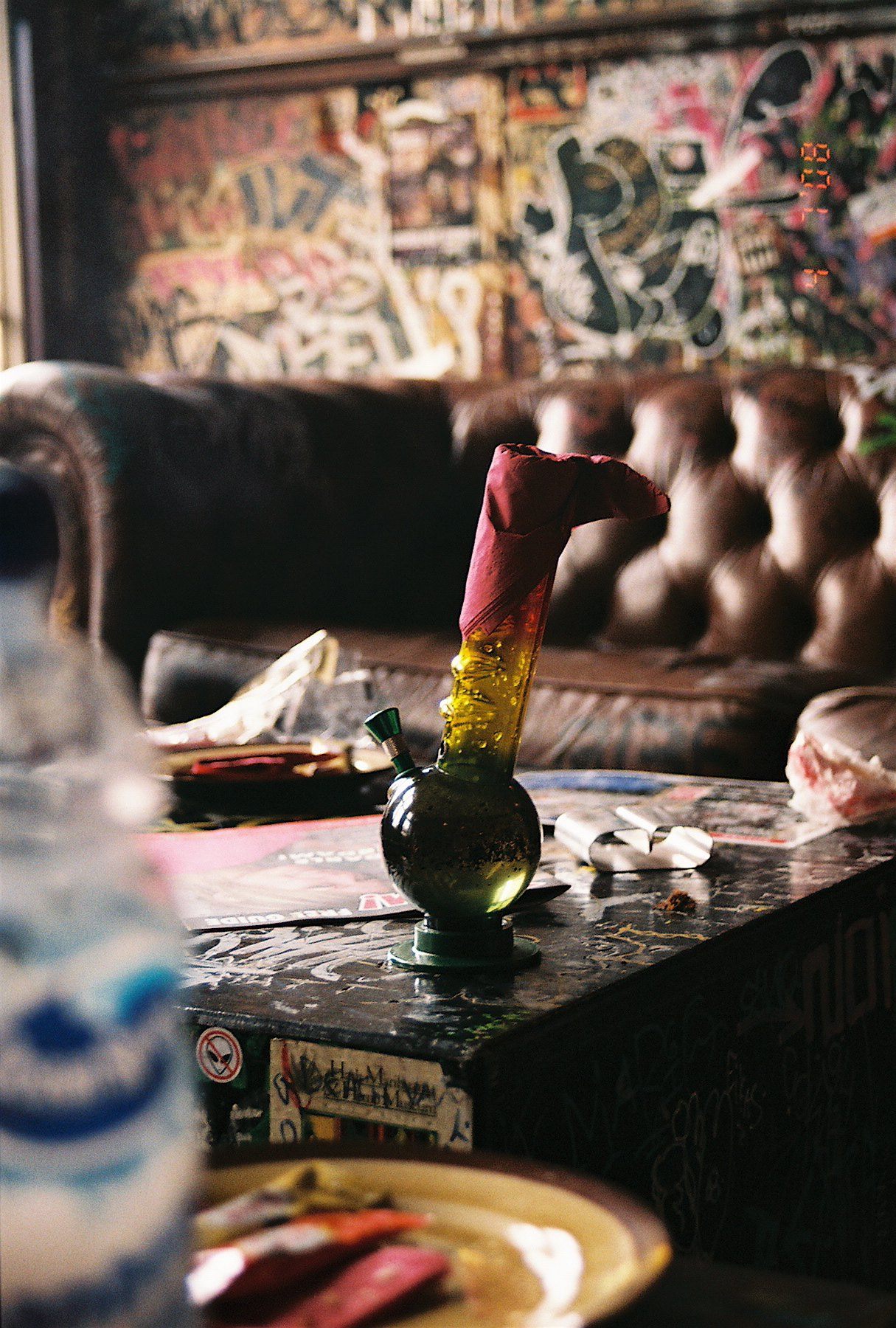
A bong in a coffeeshop in Amsterdam

Smoking joints has been common in cannabis coffeeshops. Since 1 July 2008, there is a tobacco smoking ban in the Netherlands which prohibits smoking tobacco in all hotels, restaurants, and cafés. Therefore, it is now illegal to smoke joints containing tobacco in coffeeshops. Although bongs and pure cannabis joints can still be smoked inside the premises, smoking cigarettes or joints containing tobacco is allowed only in a separate smoking room. Most coffeeshops still sell mixed joints/spliffs, i.e. those with tobacco mixed with cannabis, and have made customers smoke in upstairs or downstairs rooms. Unlike Barcelona where you have to request a membership to join a private coffeeshop, in Amsterdam anyone can go directly to a coffeeshop and buy cannabis.

== Notable coffeeshops ==
- Checkpoint coffeeshop
- Mellow Yellow coffeeshop
- The Bulldog

== Outside the Netherlands ==
=== Canada ===
The oldest and most successful cannabis café in Vancouver is New Amsterdam Café.

=== Thailand ===
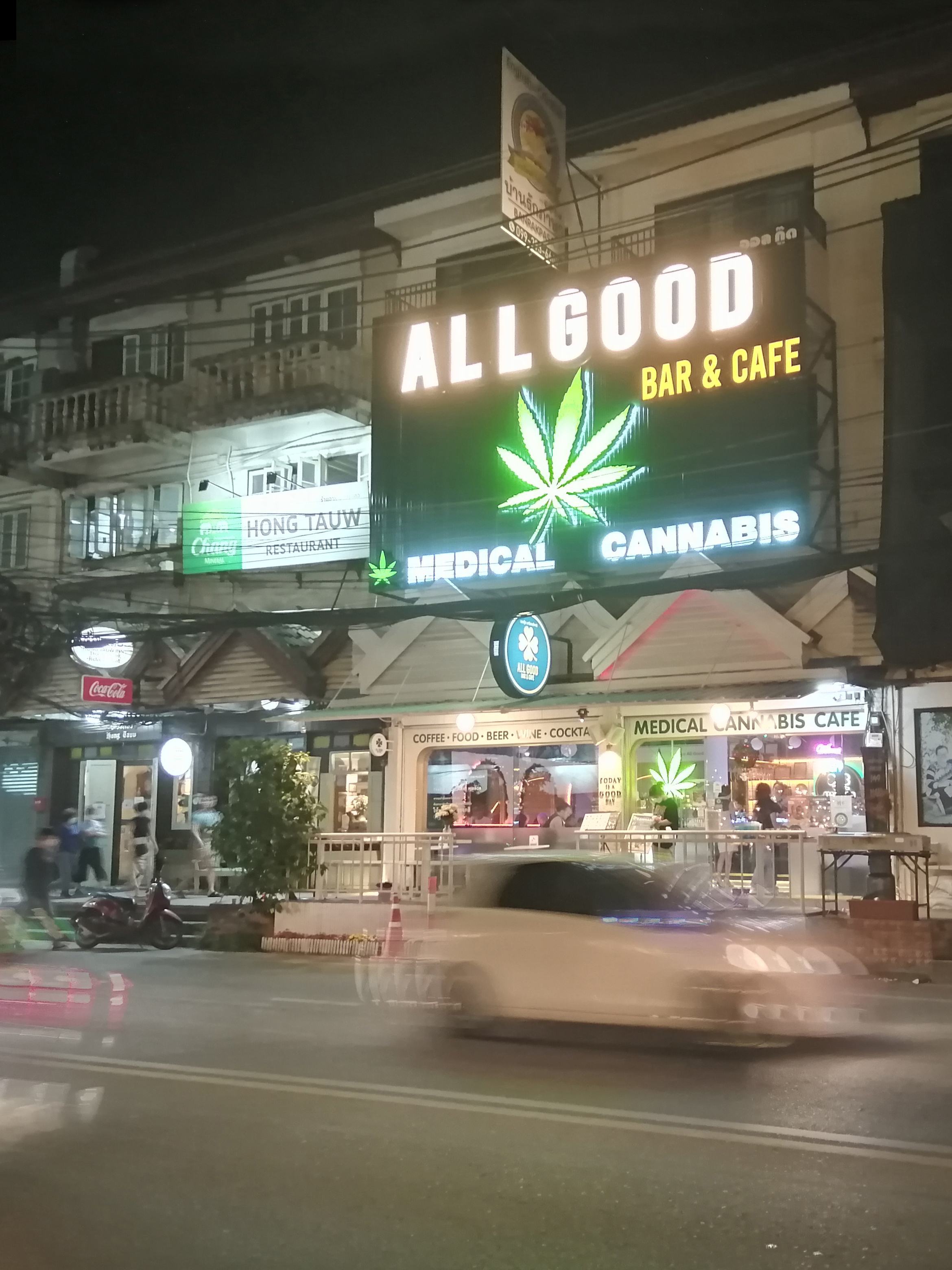
A cannabis bar and café in Chiang Mai.

Since the legalisation of marijuana in Thailand in 2022, many cafés and bars that sell marijuana have opened up across Thailand, especially in touristy areas such as Bangkok and Phuket. They have benefitted the tourism industry in Thailand.

=== United States ===
The first cannabis café in the United States, named the Original Cannabis Cafe, opened on 1 October 2019. It is located in West Hollywood, California.

== See also ==
- Cannabis in the Netherlands
- Legality of cannabis
- Smartshop
- Marijuana dispensary
