= List of cannabis companies =

Companies in the cannabis industry

The following is a list of notable cannabis companies:

- Acreage Holdings
- Amercanex
- Aphria
- Ascend Wellness Holdings
- Aurora Cannabis
- Arcadia Biosciences
- Berkeley Patients Group
- BZAM
- The Bulldog
- Cannabis City
- Cannabis Corner
- Cannabis Culture
- CanniMed
- Canopy Growth
- Checkpoint coffeeshop
- Colorado Badged Network
- Cresco Labs
- Curaleaf
- Diego Pellicer
- DNA Genetics
- DrugWarRant
- Eaze
- Goodship
- Green Thumb Industries
- GW Pharmaceuticals
- Harborside Health Center
- Have a Heart Compassion Care
- Hawthorne Gardening Company
- Heaven's Stairway
- The Hempest
- Herb
- High Times
- Hiku Brands
- Houseplant (company)
- Indiva
- iGrow
- Kush Gods
- Leafbuyer
- Leafly
- Leafs By Snoop
- Lowell Herb Co
- Marley Natural
- MedMen
- Mellow Yellow coffeeshop
- Mirth Provisions
- Openvape
- Organigram Inc.
- Papa & Barkley
- Planet 13 Holdings
- Prairie Plant Systems
- Privateer Holdings
- Releaf
- Sensi Seeds
- Sisters of the Valley
- SpeedWeed
- Steep Hill Lab
- Stiiizy
- Tikun Olam
- Tilray
- Tokyo Smoke
- Trulieve
- Uncle Ike's Pot Shop
- VIVO Cannabis
- Weed World Candies
- Weedmaps
- WeGrow Store
- Wikileaf
- Willie's Reserve
- World Famous Cannabis Cafe
- Wyld
- Zenabis

== See also ==
- Cannabis dispensaries in the United States
- Cannabis shop
- Coffeeshop (Netherlands)
- List of addiction and substance abuse organizations
- List of cannabis rights organizations
- List of cannabis seed companies
- List of celebrities who own cannabis businesses
- List of licensed producers of medical marijuana in Canada
