= List of licensed producers of medical marijuana in Canada =

As of 10 October 2019, 194 authorized licensed medical marijuana producers have been approved by Health Canada. Including:

- Aurora Cannabis
- Aphria
- CanniMed
- Canopy Growth Corporation
- Organigram
- Tantalus Labs
- The Green Organic Dutchman
- Tilray
- VIVO Cannabis
- Zenabis
