= Ascend Wellness Holdings =

Cannabis company

Ascend Wellness Holdings, Inc.
- Type: Public
- Traded as: CSE: AAWH.U; OTCQX: AAWH
- Industry: Cannabis industry
- Founded: 2018; 8 years ago
- Headquarters: Morristown, New Jersey, United States
- Products: Cannabis cultivation; Cannabis manufacturing; Retail dispensaries
- Revenue: US$500.6 million (2025)
- Website: awholdings.com

Ascend Wellness Holdings, Inc. is an American vertically integrated cannabis operator with operations in multiple states. The company's business includes the cultivation, manufacturing, and retail distribution of cannabis products. It is publicly traded on the Canadian Securities Exchange (CSE) under the symbol AAWH.U and OTCQX under the symbol AAWH.

== History ==
Ascend Wellness Holdings was founded in 2018 and operated as a limited liability company before reincorporating in Delaware and becoming a public company in 2021. Its initial public offering on the Canadian Securities Exchange in May 2021 was followed by a 22% increase in its stock price on the first trading day.

The company expanded its retail in early 2021 by acquiring two MOCA dispensaries in Chicago. Budtenders at one of the Chicago dispensaries voted to join Teamsters Local 777 in May 2021.

Ascend faced challenges entering New York’s recreational cannabis market after the state legalized cannabis in 2021 due to regulatory fees and the prioritization of social equity applicants. In 2022, the company became involved in a legal dispute with MedMen Enterprises over a failed agreement to acquire a majority stake in MedMen's New York operations. MedMen later filed for Chapter 7 bankruptcy in 2024.

AWH itself was co-founded by Abner Kurtin, who led the company until 2022. In 2024, the board brought in member Samuel Brill as the new CEO during a leadership shake-up, while fellow co-founder Francis Perullo took on the role of president.

Ascend has established its vertically integrated operations in multiple U.S. states, such as Illinois, Maryland, Pennsylvania, Massachusetts, Michigan, New Jersey, and Ohio.

== Operations ==
Since inception in 2018, the company has completed cultivation facility builds in Illinois, Massachusetts, Michigan, New Jersey, Ohio, and Pennsylvania. As of December 31, 2025, Ascend had 47 open and operating retail locations, including nine retail partner locations.

Ascend’s in-house brands include: Ozone, Simply Herb, High Wired, Honor Roll, Royale, and Effin.

== Finance ==
In July 2024, Ascend announced the issuance of $235 million in 12.75% senior secured notes, set to mature in 2029. According to its financial reports, the company generated $562 million in revenue for the full fiscal year 2024,and $500 million in revenue for the full fiscal year 2025.

== Community Initiatives ==
The company has partnered with community organizations in New Jersey to support record-clearing and expungement events for individuals with prior cannabis-related offenses.

== See also ==
- Cannabis in the United States
- Cannabis industry
- Canadian Securities Exchange
- List of cannabis companies
