= Overgrow =

Overgrow may mean:

- to grow over with foliage, or to grow beyond normal size; grown over with unwanted vegetation; To cover or own with moss.

See also

- Overgrow (website), a defunct online magazine.
- Overgrown by James Blake
