= Aurora Sky and Aurora Sun =

Canadian cannabis growing greenhouse

Aurora Sky
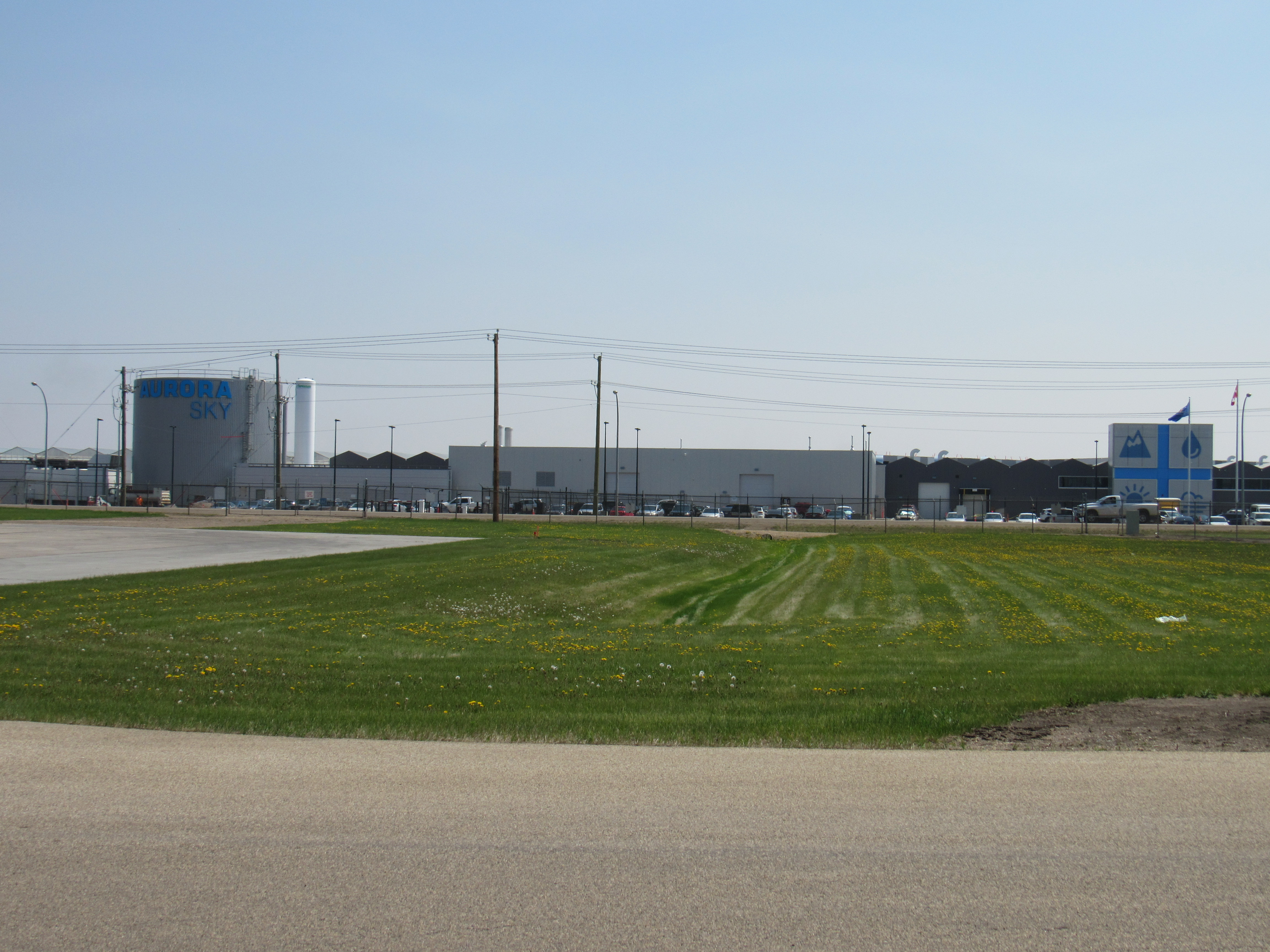
- Aurora Sky in 2018
- Interactive map of the Aurora Sky area

General information
- Type: Greenhouse
- Location: Edmonton International Airport, Leduc County, Alberta
- Coordinates: 53.316°N 113.573°W
- Completed: January 2019
- Owner: Aurora Cannabis

Technical details
- Floor area: 800,000 sq ft (74,000 m^{2})

Aurora Sun
- Interactive map of the Aurora Sun area

General information
- Type: Greenhouse
- Location: Box Springs Business Park, Medicine Hat, Alberta
- Coordinates: 50.073°N 110.744°W
- Groundbreaking: 2018
- Construction stopped: November 2019
- Cost: CAD 130 million
- Owner: Aurora Cannabis

Technical details
- Floor area: up to 1,600,000 sq ft (150,000 m^{2})

Design and construction
- Main contractor: Dawson Wallace Construction

Aurora Sky and Aurora Sun are Canadian greenhouses originally built to grow cannabis. Both were built by the firm Aurora Cannabis following the complete legalization of cannabis in Canada in 2018. The company calls them "sky class" facilities.

Aurora Sky is a 100,000 kg per year, 800,000 sq ft (74,000 m^{2}) cannabis growing greenhouse on Edmonton International Airport property in Leduc County, Alberta. Construction broke ground in June 2017, and it was completed in January 2019. The company closed the Aurora Sun facility in 2020 and reduced its operations at Aurora Sky after several layoffs.

Construction of the Aurora Sun facility in Medicine Hat, which was planned to be 50% to 100% larger, was paused in late 2019. If construction were completed, Sun would become the largest cannabis greenhouse in the world.

In May 2022, Aurora announced it would close Aurora Sky. Aurora acquired a majority stake in greenhouse company BevoAgtech, which took over both the Sky and Sun facilities to produce orchids and starter vegetables in 2023.
