= Have a Heart =

Have a Heart may refer to:

== Film and TV ==
- Have a Heart (1928 film) starring Jimmy Aubrey
- Have a Heart (film), a 1934 drama film directed by David Butler
- Have a Heart (TV series), a 1955 game show

== Music ==
- "Just Have a Heart", a song by Celine Dion from the 1990 album Unison, also recorded with the title "Have a Heart"
- "Have a Heart", song by Dean Martin from the 1965 album Dean Martin Hits Again
- "Have a Heart", a song by Bonnie Raitt from the 1989 album Nick of Time
- "Have a Heart", a song by Prince from the 2002 album One Nite Alone...
- "Have a Heart, a song played by Ruby Braff and Gene DiNovi, recorded in 1979 on Sackville SK2CD-5005, composed by Gene DiNovi with lyrics by Johnny Mercer

== See also ==
- Have a Heart Compassion Care, a cannabis company in the United States
