= Uncle Ike's Pot Shop =

Cannabis retailer in Seattle, Washington

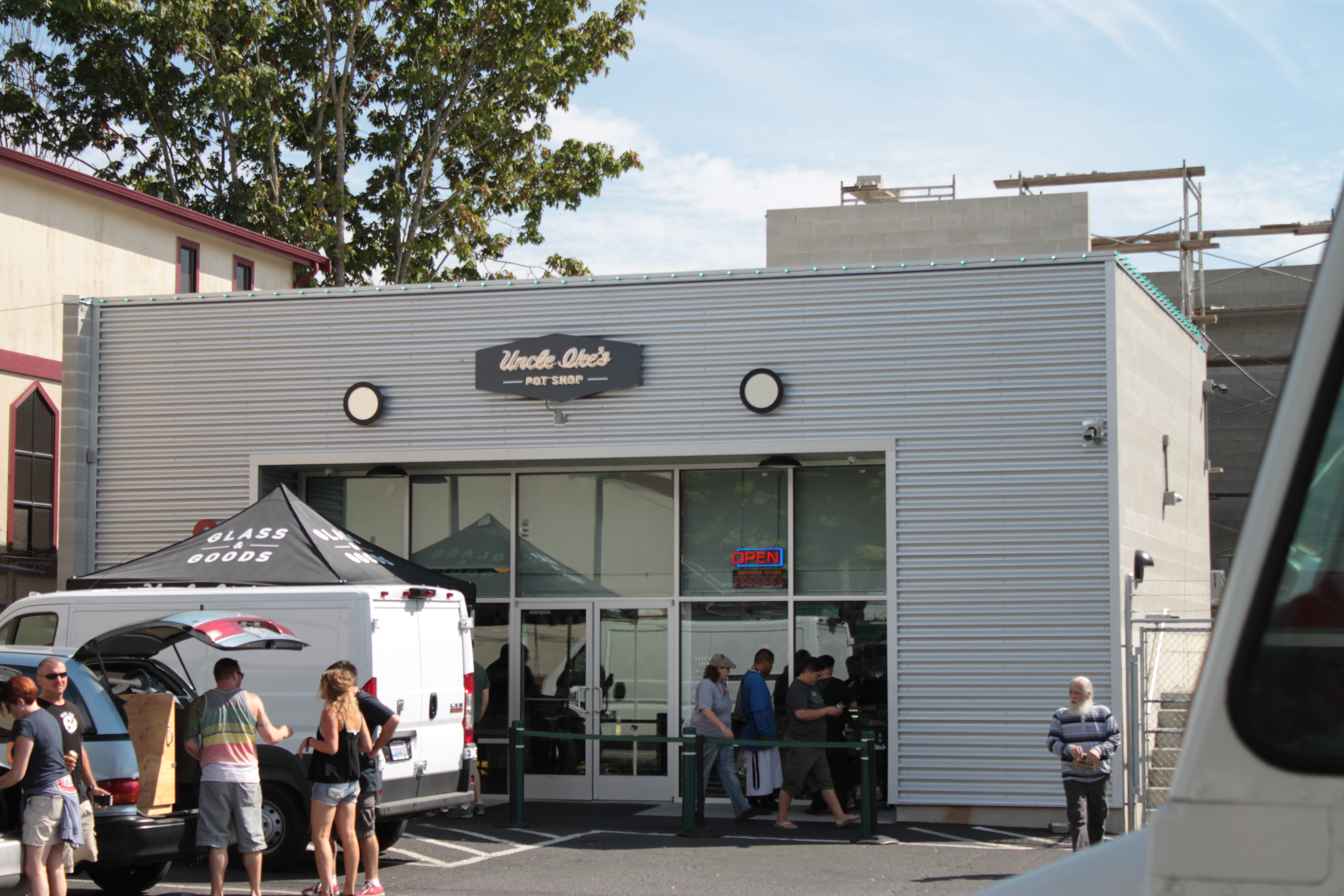
- Uncle Ike's Pot Shop in 2015
- Formation: September 30, 2014; 11 years ago
- Founder: Ian Karl Eisenberg
- Type: Retail
- Location: Seattle, Washington, United States
- Coordinates: 47.6133°N 122.3025°W
- Products: Cannabis and related glass products
- Revenue: Over $1 million per month.
- Website: ikes.com

Uncle Ike's Pot Shop is an establishment in Seattle, Washington, licensed by the Washington State Liquor and Cannabis Board to sell cannabis to the public.

== History ==
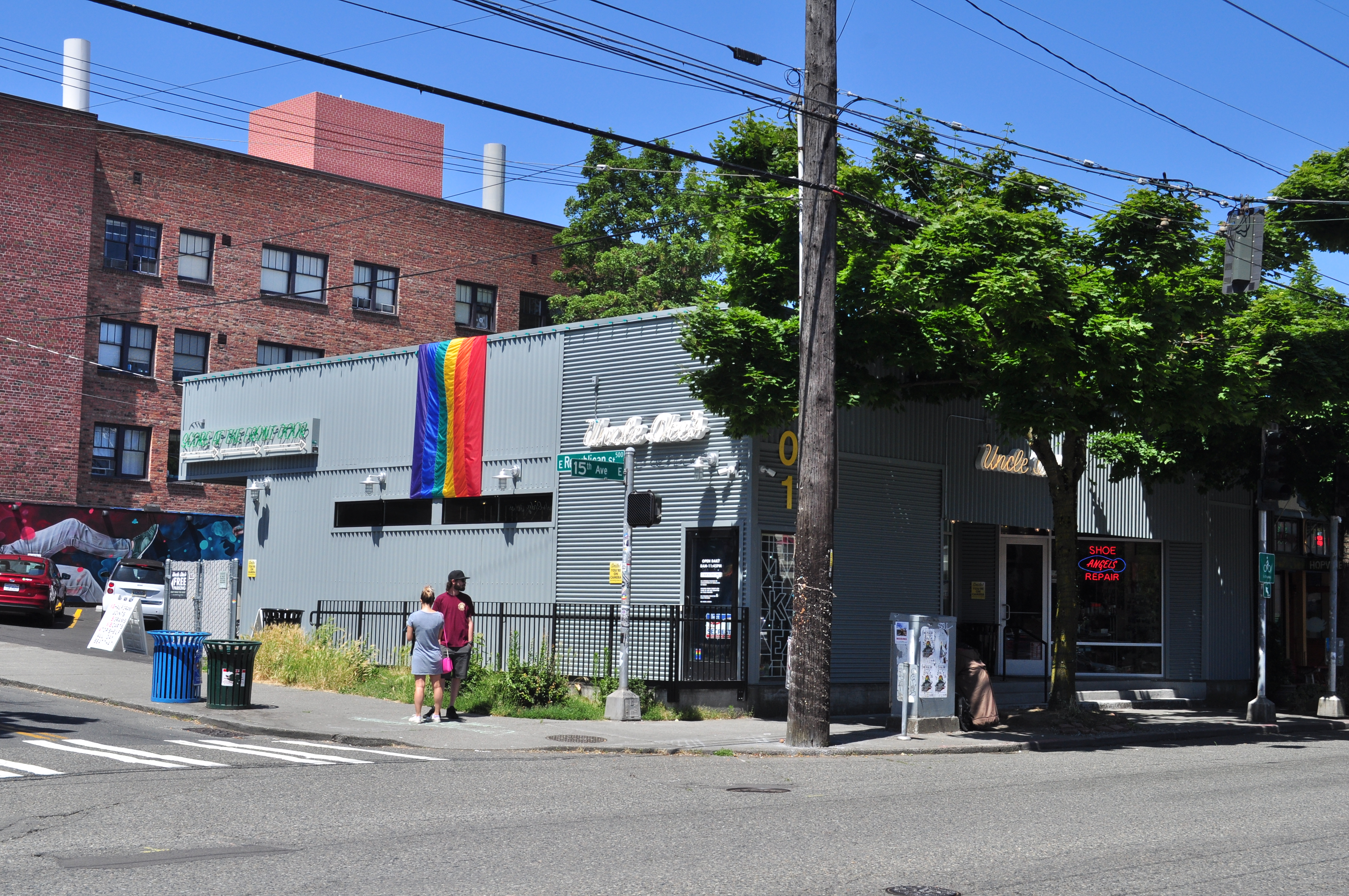
The shop at the intersection of 15th Ave E and Republican

Uncle Ike's Pot Shop opened on September 30, 2014, and was the second cannabis retailer in Seattle, after Cannabis City. As of 2016 it led the state of Washington in cannabis retail sales at over $1 million per month. The proprietor is Ian Karl Eisenberg, aka "Uncle Ike".

The business is both praised for being the first to inform consumers about pesticides in their product, and criticized for contributing to gentrification of the neighborhood it is located in, Seattle's Central District. In 2016, the store conducted a voluntary recall, along with some other Washington state dispensaries, after cannabis product testing indicated undesirable pesticide levels in cannabis products from some suppliers. The incident revealed that there was "no unified protocol" for initiating recalls or notifying businesses or consumers about pesticide.

When it opened, the shop was said to be "built like a fortress" with security provided by a company owned and staffed by ex-military service members. As of 2022, Uncle Ike's has expanded to five shops in Seattle, including an outlet store in unincorporated community of White Center, Washington just outside of Seattle.

The Capitol Hill store was struck twice in three days in late May–early June 2025, in two smash and grab burglaries involving the use of a stolen car as a ram to gain entry to the building. The incidents, and other similar attacks, indicated "the relative ease of car theft" in Seattle.

=== Controversy ===
Protests at the shop started a week after it opened in 2014.

The Seattle chapter of Black Lives Matter, under the leadership of activist Marissa Johnson, was criticized for allowing antisemitic remarks at some 2015 rallies concerning Eisenberg's ownership.

After a Martin Luther King Jr. Day, 2016 protest outside his store, Eisenberg replied through social media that he had moved into vacant property and his several businesses do not contribute to gentrification. Some protestors complained on 420 Day (April 20), 2016, that the business is located three feet (1 meter) from a church that sometimes has youth events. More antisemitic comments from a Seattle activist were recorded by Eisenberg and posted online in 2017.

Eisenberg reported more vandalism during a July 22, 2020 riot which he considered unrelated to the Capitol Hill Autonomous Zone protests, but falsely labeling him as a former member of the Israel Defense Forces.
