= Harborside Health Center =

Cannabis dispensary in California, US

Coordinates: 37.78396°N 122.24243°W

Harborside, formerly Harborside Health Center, is a recreational and medical cannabis dispensary, with its flagship location in Oakland, California, and an additional location in San Jose. Founded in 2006 by Steve DeAngelo and Dave Wedding Dress, Harborside operates as a non-profit patient collective. In December 2011, Harborside Health Center was featured in the Discovery Channel's four-part documentary series, Weed Wars. In June 2013 CNN premiered "Inside Man", an 8-episode documentary hosted and produced by Morgan Spurlock. The show's first episode provided a detailed, inside look at California's medical marijuana industry and featured Spurlock working in Harborside Health Center, as well as it described the legal troubles of the center.

It is considered to be the largest nonprofit medical cannabis dispensary in the state, if not the nation.

== Federal case ==
In the summer of 2012, Northern District of California U.S. Attorney Melinda Haag filed civil forfeiture actions against the landlords of Harborside Health Center's two locations in an effort to evict the dispensary. Harborside challenged the evictions in state court, maintaining its compliance with state and local laws. A Superior Court judge dismissed the Oakland eviction, noting that the lease explicitly stated the use of the premises for the distribution of medical marijuana. The City of Oakland rallied behind Harborside and attempted to join the dispensary in the fight, but a judge overruled their action. In 2015 three members of Congress from California—Reps. Sam Farr, Dana Rohrabacher and Barbara Lee—released a statement in support of Harborside, saying that the US Department of Justice "has overstepped its bounds" and "is not acting within the spirit or the letter of the law nor in the best interests of the people who depend on Harborside for reliable, safe medical marijuana." In May 2016, the Department of Justice dropped the 4 year case against Harborside Health Center.

== Patient services ==
Harborside Health Center was the first medical cannabis dispensary to introduce lab testing. The dispensary also offered (circa 2010) free wellness services including acupuncture, yoga, Reiki and others. Harborside was the first marijuana organization to broadcast the administration of the non-psychoactive cannabinoid, CBD, to a child afflicted with Dravet syndrome, a rare form of epilepsy ("Weed Wars," Episode 3).

== Retail sales ==
Beginning 1 January 2018, Harborside began retail sales to adults. All adults over the age of 21 with a valid ID may enter.
