= Marissa Johnson =

Black Lives Matter activist (born 1990/1991)

Marissa Jenae Johnson
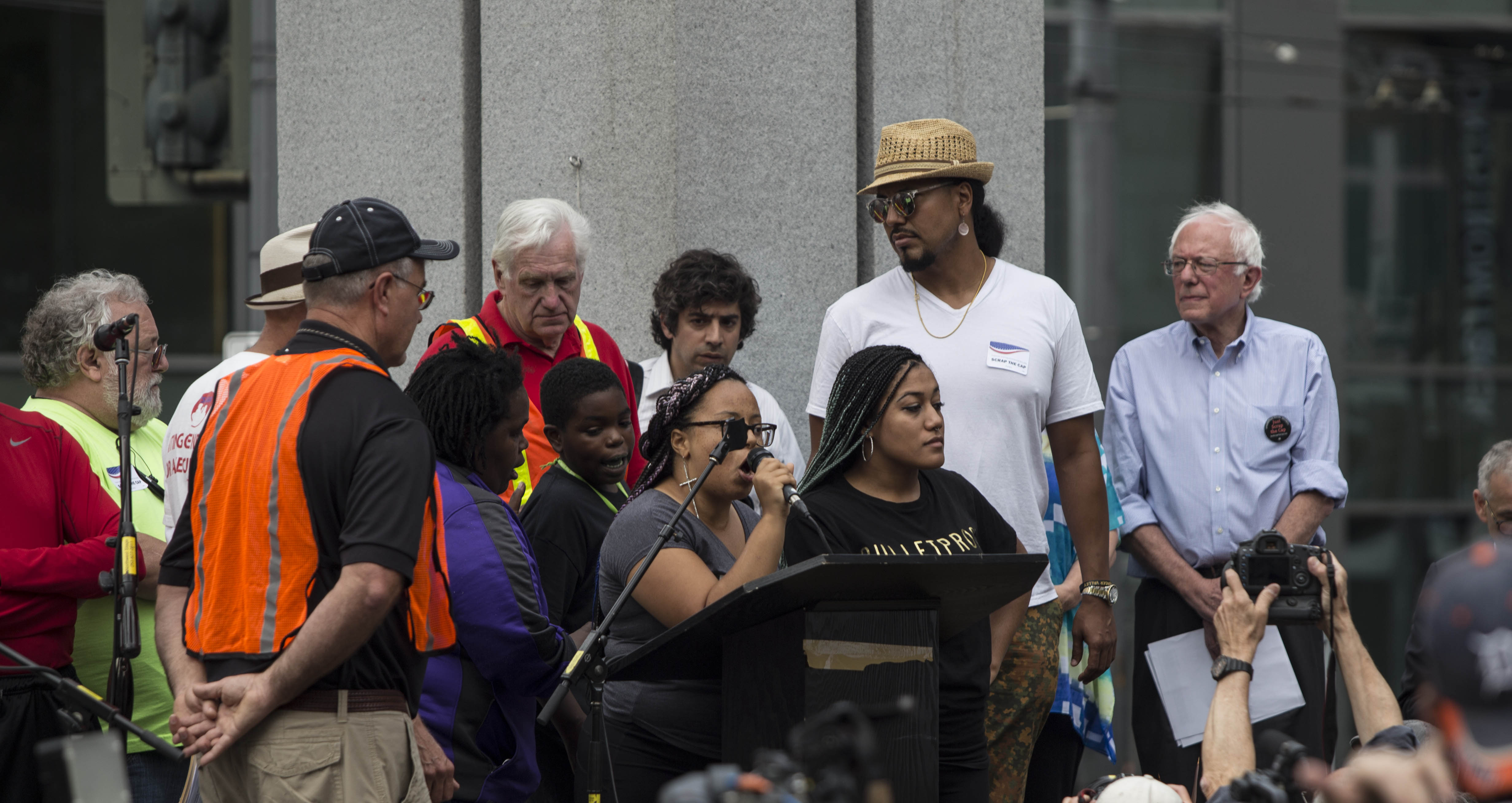
- Marissa Johnson at microphone at an August 2015 political rally in Seattle, with U.S. presidential candidate Bernie Sanders standing aside
- Born: 1990/1991
- Education: Seattle Pacific University
- Organization: Black Lives Matter

Marissa Jenae Johnson (born 1990/1991) is an American activist who attained notoriety when she interrupted U.S. presidential candidate Bernie Sanders at an August 2015 rally in Seattle. Her activism has been associated with the Black Lives Matter movement. She is a founder of a Seattle-based justice group called Outside Agitators 206, which was disbanded when she became a cofounder of the Seattle chapter of Black Lives Matter around September 2015.

== Activism ==
Johnson had been noted in media outlets in Seattle and beyond for her engagement and disruption of public meetings before the Sanders incident. She organized a November 2014 die-in at a Downtown Seattle shopping mall which shut down the mall on Black Friday 2014. At a January 2015 city council meeting to discuss the use of body cameras by city police, she caused suspension of the meeting and said "I don't need a home video of my oppression".

Johnson has a black father and a white mother, and she describes herself as an evangelical Christian. She has cited her faith as a motivator for her activism, saying "white supremacy is sin". She graduated from Seattle Pacific University in 2013 with a degree in theology. After graduating, she went to work as a nanny. Some writers have said she has been "smeared" as a Tea Party movement activist, and she has said that her parents were Tea Party members when she lived with them. Johnson has said that she once supported Sarah Palin as a national political candidate, and criticized "white liberal" people for being like Rachel Dolezal.

The disruption of Bernie Sanders' speech was described by Seattle political commentator Maria Tomchick in December 2015 as being an important part of the "biggest news story of 2015", the expansion of the Black Lives Matter movement into the national political stage.

=== Black Lives Matter Seattle chapter controversies ===
The Seattle BLM chapter of Black Lives Matter has been criticized while under Johnson's leadership for allowing antisemitic remarks at rallies in the vicinity of Uncle Ike's Pot Shop in Seattle, whose owner was accused of gentrifying a traditionally black neighborhood.

== Bibliography ==
- So You Wanna Be An Ally?, Harper Perennial 2019, ISBN 9780062844118, OCLC 1020028741
