= Leafs By Snoop =

Cannabis brand owned by Snoop Dogg

- Founded: 2015
- Founder: Snoop Dogg
- Headquarters: Denver, Colorado, U.S.

Leafs By Snoop is a cannabis brand owned and promoted by the rapper Snoop Dogg and produced by Canopy Growth Corporation.

== History ==
Leafs By Snoop was launched in November 2015 in Denver, Colorado, at the home of LivWell owner John Lord, a few months after the website Merry Jane was launched.

In June 2016, it was reported that Snoop Dogg was in a trademark dispute with the Canadian ice hockey team the Toronto Maple Leafs over his Leafs by Snoop logo. By 2018, the Leafs By Snoop products were distributed in Canada by Canopy Growth Corporation, though the Canadian government had warned about celebrity endorsements of cannabis products. In February 2019, the Toronto Maple Leafs confirmed that they had filed an intellectual property lawsuit.

== Description ==
Leafs by Snoop offers eight products:

- Indica dominant: Bananas, Northern Lights, Moonbeam, Cali Kush and Purple bush
- Sativa dominant: Lemon Pie, Blueberry Dream and Tangerine Man
- High-CBD strain called 3D CBD

The Atlantic noted that the carefully designed packaging by Pentagram had been designed "to make marijuana appeal to upscale consumers".

== See also ==
- List of celebrities who own cannabis businesses
- Marley Natural
- Willie's Reserve
