= SpeedWeed =

American cannabis delivery company

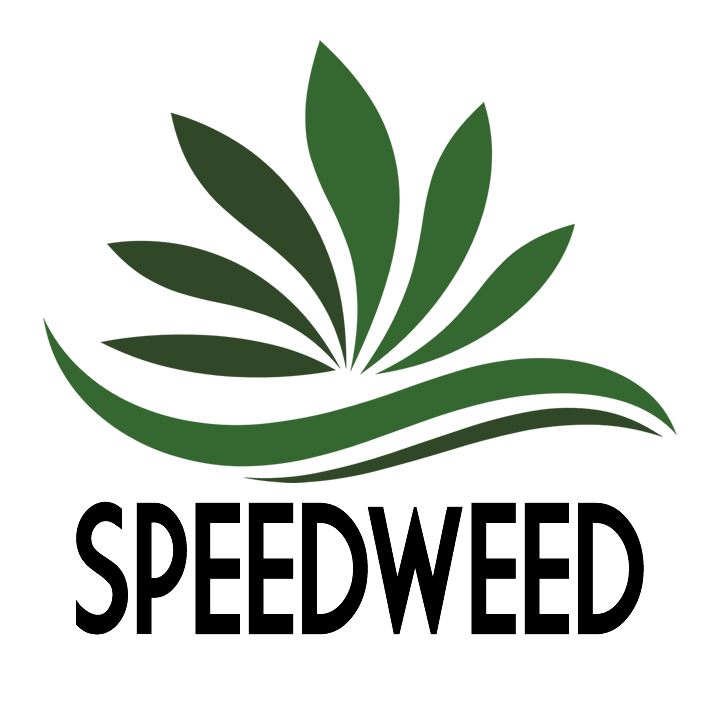
- Company type: Private
- Industry: Delivery, Healthcare
- Founded: October 2011
- Founders: AJ Gentile CEO; Gino Gentile Business development; Jen Gentile CMO
- Headquarters: Los Angeles, California, U.S.
- Areas served: Los Angeles, Orange County, California
- Services: Delivery
- Revenue: $2.5 million dollars (2014)
- Members: 24,000 (2014)
- Number of employees: 50 (2014)
- Website: www.speedweed.com

SpeedWeed is an American cannabis delivery company headquartered in Los Angeles, California. Founded in 2011 by AJ and Gino Gentile, the company is one of the largest in the industry and services more than 20,000 clients in over 6,000 square miles within Los Angeles and Orange County.

== History ==
Brothers AJ and Gino Gentile began working in the cannabis business together with the start of an edible company named Baked Bears. The brand was picked up by dispensaries around the L.A. area. Shortly after, the brothers changed their focus from production to delivery. The Gentile's and AJ's wife Jen, decided that they would create a delivery company that would be in compliance with all of the L.A. regulations. Before launching the delivery service in 2011, AJ studied the operations manuals from delivery services such as Papa John's, Domino's, and FedEx, and developed SpeedWeed's business plan.

== Operations ==
The company uses a spoke-hub distribution method which helps keeps delivery times consistent across the service area. The company allows members to place an order by phone or internet and all deliveries are tracked remotely from a distribution center to ensure delivery. Los Angeles and other California cities have allowed all delivery services to operate without interruption.

== Membership ==
All users are required to register for the service online and be above the age of 18. Additionally, all users need to possess a current State issued ID and current doctors recommendation for medical cannabis. Notable clients include the rapper Sky Blu and comedian Joe Rogan. Brands included in delivery are the made in-house Baked Bears as well as several other brands such as, Golden Gateway, Cheeba Chews, Kiva, Sensi Chews, Edipure and Honey Vape Vaporizers.

== Opposition ==
While there are no direct protests against the company or its competitors, the topic of cannabis legalization in the United States remains controversial. While some states have legalized the use of cannabis fully, California remains a state that has only legalized medicinal usage. In 2013, Proposition D, a law aimed at reducing the number of dispensaries in Los Angeles was passed, while the law shut down many illegal dispensary storefronts it has led to an increased number in delivery services. This has led California cities such as Riverside, to ban cannabis delivery altogether. In September 2015 with planned measures to legalize medical cannabis looming, California lawmakers reached a new deal on legislation to regulate medicinal cannabis. Due to the confusion associated with lawfully accessing and distributing medicinal cannabis, the company keeps lawyers on retainer to help mitigate any legal issues.

== See also ==
- Cannabis in the United States
- List of cannabis companies
