= Wyld (brand) =

Cannabis brand

- Industry: Cannabis
- Founded: 2015; 11 years ago in Tumalo, Oregon, United States
- Founders: Aaron Morris; Chris Joseph
- Headquarters: Portland, Oregon, United States
- Key people: Eric Hoest (CFO); Jonathan Ross (CSR)
- Products: Cannabis edibles
- Owner: Aaron Morris; Chris Joseph
- Parent: Northwest Commonwealth, LLC
- Website: wyldcanna.com

Wyld is a brand of cannabis edibles founded in 2015 by Aaron Morris and Chris Joseph.

== History ==
Wyld was established in 2015 out of a farmhouse in Tumalo, Oregon by spirits-industry veterans Aaron Morris and Chris Joseph on a ranch that had already been licensed for growing cannabis. Describing the first couple of batches as tasting like "crayons", Chris Joseph spoke with his gelatin supplier and eventually improved the recipe, creating Wyld's first two flavors, marionberry and raspberry in the process. In 2016, the company moved to its current headquarters in Portland, Oregon.

== Reception ==
Writing for Forbes.com, Lauren Yoshiko called the gummies "Juicy and soft" and lacking the cannabis oil taste usually associated with edibles. She also enjoyed the flavor, saying that if she wasn't "treating them like medicine" she would eat the "whole pack of ten in one sitting".

== See also ==
- List of cannabis companies
