= North Bonneville, Washington =

City in Washington, United States

North Bonneville
- City
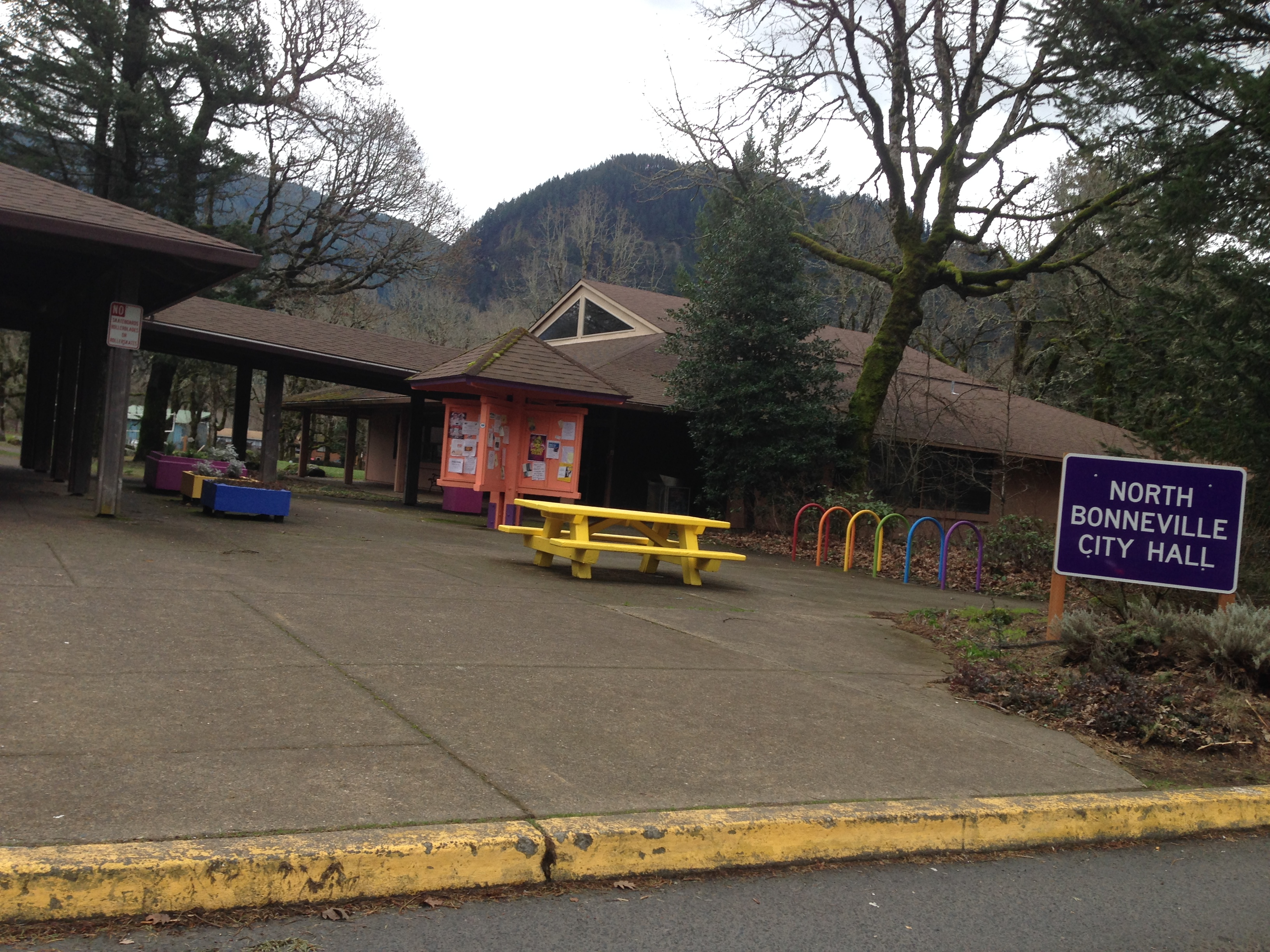
- City Hall in North Bonneville, February 2016

- Location of North Bonneville, Washington
- Coordinates: 45°38′05″N 121°59′05″W
- Country: United States
- State: Washington
- County: Skamania

Government
  - Type: Mayor–council
  - Mayor: Brian Sabo

Area
  - Total: 2.78 sq mi (7.19 km^{2})
  - Land: 2.53 sq mi (6.54 km^{2})
  - Water: 0.25 sq mi (0.65 km^{2})
- Elevation: 59 ft (18 m)

Population (2020)
  - Total: 1,397
  - Density: 553/sq mi (214/km^{2})
- Time zone: UTC-8 (Pacific (PST))
  - Summer (DST): UTC-7 (PDT)
- ZIP code: 98639
- Area code: 509
- FIPS code: 53-49555
- GNIS feature ID: 2411271
- Website: City of North Bonneville

North Bonneville is a city along the Columbia River in Skamania County, Washington, United States. The population was 1,397 at the 2020 census. It lies within the Columbia River Gorge National Scenic Area on the north side of Bonneville Dam complex. The city was originally developed to house the dam's construction workers in the 1930s and later relocated from its original site in the 1970s to accommodate new dam facilities.

== History ==
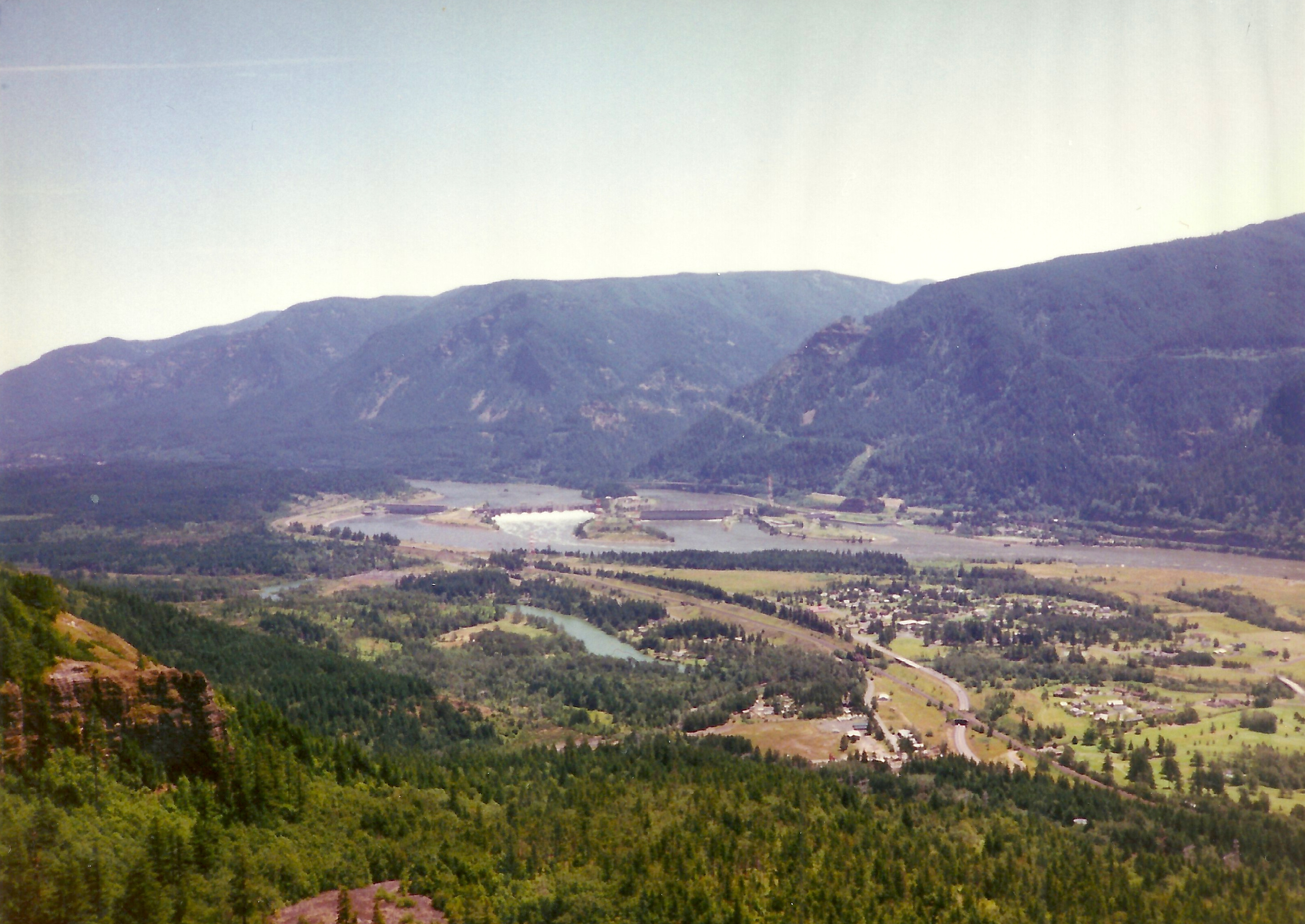
North Bonneville, Bonneville Dam, and surrounding area from Beacon Rock State Park, 1997

The community of North Bonneville developed as a construction town next to the massive Bonneville Lock, Dam, and powerhouse project begun in late 1933. North Bonneville was officially incorporated on June 25, 1935.

The Columbia's north shore where North Bonneville had grown was selected by federal agencies in 1971 as the site for the second Powerhouse. Faced with the prospect of being displaced and disbanded the townspeople determined to relocate as a community. Intense efforts by citizens’ groups and planning assistance from state sources finally led to agreements with the U.S. Army Corps of Engineers to hire professionals for the design and construction of a new town. Contractors then prepared the chosen town site for the initial community of 600 people as the old town was devoured by the enormous excavation for the new powerhouse.

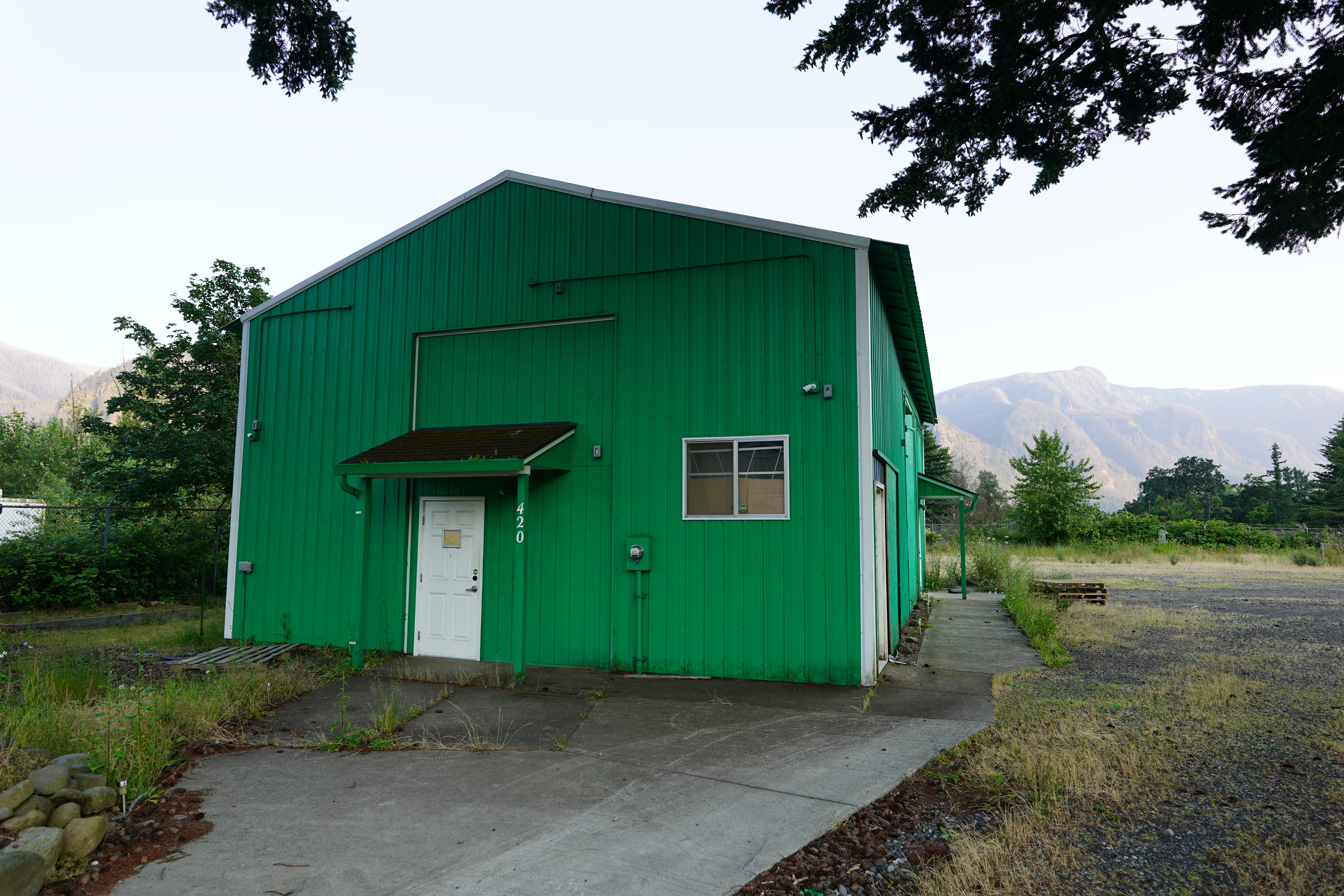
Original location of Cannabis Corner at 420 Evergreen Drive, North Bonneville, Washington, July 2020

Federal responsibility for the North Bonneville relocation was expanded in 1974 with enactment of Public Law 93-251, referred to as the McCormack legislation. This law specifically broadened the Corps' authority and obligation in relocation assistance to North Bonneville . The $35 million relocation project included raising the new town site above the 100-year flood plain, construction of streets, utilities, lighting, sewage system, water supply and sewage treatment plant, flood protection, parks, a central business district and all public buildings. Town sitting required highway and railway relocation. And residents and business were furnished temporary housing until they could build their own permanent homes and facilities. The new town was built to accommodate 1500 residents. A celebration of the successful relocation was held on July 29, 1978.

In October 1991, North Bonneville became the first city in Washington history to declare bankruptcy under Chapter 9. The city government had filed several lawsuits against the Corps of Engineers to resolve disputes related to the 1970s relocation. A lawsuit that alleged a breach of contract was filed in 1980 and was ruled in the Corps' favor in 1991, which resulted in a $365,000 payment awarded to the Corps. The city government was unable to pay the sum and voted to file for bankruptcy protection.

=== Public Development Authority ===
Following the legalization of cannabis by a 2012 voter initiative in Washington State, the North Bonneville Public Development Authority was created to manage a city-owned cannabis retail store that opened on March 7, 2015. It was notable for operating Cannabis Corner, the first government-owned cannabis shop in the United States.

== Geography ==
According to the United States Census Bureau, the city has a total area of 2.62 square miles (6.79 km^{2}), of which, 2.41 square miles (6.24 km^{2}) is land and 0.21 square miles (0.54 km^{2}) is water.

The city is located on State Route 14 between Skamania and the city of Stevenson.

=== Climate ===
This region experiences warm (but not hot) and dry summers, with no average monthly temperatures above 71.6 °F. According to the Köppen Climate Classification system, North Bonneville has a warm-summer Mediterranean climate, abbreviated "Csb" on climate maps.

== Demographics ==
Historical population
Census	Pop.	Note	%±
1940	643		—
1950	564		−12.3%
1960	494		−12.4%
1970	459		−7.1%
1980	394		−14.2%
1990	411		4.3%
2000	593		44.3%
2010	956		61.2%
2020	1,397		46.1%
U.S. Decennial Census; 2020 Census

=== 2020 census ===
As of the 2020 census, North Bonneville had a population of 1,397. The median age was 44.0 years, with 17.2% of residents under the age of 18 and 15.7% aged 65 years or older. For every 100 females there were 112.6 males, and for every 100 females age 18 and over there were 115.5 males age 18 and over.

There were 426 households in North Bonneville, of which 28.9% had children under the age of 18 living in them. Of all households, 48.6% were married-couple households, 21.6% were households with a male householder and no spouse or partner present, and 21.4% were households with a female householder and no spouse or partner present. About 25.1% of all households were made up of individuals and 11.8% had someone living alone who was 65 years of age or older.

There were 454 housing units, of which 6.2% were vacant. The homeowner vacancy rate was 0.0% and the rental vacancy rate was 8.9%.

0.0% of residents lived in urban areas, while 100.0% lived in rural areas.

Racial composition as of the 2020 census
Race	Number	Percent
White	1,096	78.5%
Black or African American	46	3.3%
American Indian and Alaska Native	56	4.0%
Asian	12	0.9%
Native Hawaiian and Other Pacific Islander	13	0.9%
Some other race	48	3.4%
Two or more races	126	9.0%
Hispanic or Latino (of any race)	115	8.2%

=== 2010 census ===
As of the 2010 census, there were 956 people, 420 households, and 262 families residing in the city. The population density was 396.7 inhabitants per square mile (153.2/km^{2}). There were 459 housing units at an average density of 190.5 per square mile (73.6/km^{2}). The racial makeup of the city was 94.9% White, 0.3% African American, 0.7% Native American, 1.5% Asian, 0.6% from other races, and 2.0% from two or more races. Hispanic or Latino of any race were 4.4% of the population.

There were 420 households, of which 28.6% had children under the age of 18 living with them, 45.7% were married couples living together, 10.0% had a female householder with no husband present, 6.7% had a male householder with no wife present, and 37.6% were non-families. 33.6% of all households were made up of individuals, and 11.5% had someone living alone who was 65 years of age or older. The average household size was 2.28 and the average family size was 2.86.

The median age in the city was 42.8 years. 24.1% of residents were under the age of 18; 6.1% were between the ages of 18 and 24; 22.7% were from 25 to 44; 32.5% were from 45 to 64; and 14.7% were 65 years of age or older. The gender makeup of the city was 50.2% male and 49.8% female.

=== 2000 census ===
As of the 2000 census, there were 593 people, 228 households, and 171 families residing in the city. The population density was 246.1 people per square mile (95.0/km^{2}). There were 237 housing units at an average density of 98.3 per square mile (38.0/km^{2}). The racial makeup of the city was 92.75% White, 0.34% African American, 0.84% Native American, 2.53% Asian, 1.52% from other races, and 2.02% from two or more races. Hispanic or Latino of any race were 1.69% of the population.

There were 228 households, out of which 38.2% had children under the age of 18 living with them, 61.0% were married couples living together, 10.1% had a female householder with no husband present, and 25.0% were non-families. 20.6% of all households were made up of individuals, and 7.9% had someone living alone who was 65 years of age or older. The average household size was 2.60 and the average family size was 3.01.

In the city, the age distribution of the population shows 27.5% under the age of 18, 5.2% from 18 to 24, 29.8% from 25 to 44, 24.3% from 45 to 64, and 13.2% who were 65 years of age or older. The median age was 38 years. For every 100 females, there were 103.8 males. For every 100 females age 18 and over, there were 97.2 males.

The median income for a household in the city was $35,583, and the median income for a family was $38,333. Males had a median income of $32,857 versus $25,313 for females. The per capita income for the city was $16,921. About 7.3% of families and 7.2% of the population were below the poverty line, including 8.2% of those under age 18 and 5.9% of those age 65 or over.

== Parks and recreation ==
North Bonneville is situated within the Columbia River Gorge National Scenic Area, which contains nearby recreational areas including Beacon Rock State Park and the Pierce National Wildlife Refuge. The area has nearby access to the Pacific Crest Trail, and hikers can access Greenleaf Peak and Table Mountain which are in close proximity to the community.

The Bonneville Dam and its spillway, which are visible from the city, are a major tourist attraction in the area. The Bridge of the Gods is northeast of North Bonneville.

== See also ==
- List of cities in Washington
