= Tantalus Labs =

Canadian cannabis company

Tantalus Labs is a brand owned by Atlantic Cultivation, and previously was a Canadian Licensed Producer of cannabis. Originally based out of British Columbia and established in 2012 by Dan Sutton, Tantalus Labs cultivated in their cannabis greenhouse, SunLab which was the first purpose-built cannabis greenhouse in North America. In June 2023, Tantalus Labs announced it would cease operations and began laying off the majority of its employees.

== History ==
Tantalus Labs was founded by Dan Sutton and incorporated on October 29, 2012. Having seen a consultation document outlining the Marijuana for Medical Purposes Regulation (MMPR), he recognized the opportunity to rethink how cannabis was being grown in BC and engaged agricultural experts to design a more efficient methodology. The result was the planning and design of SunLab, the first purpose-built cannabis cultivation facility in North America.

On May 29, 2017, Health Canada approved the company's submission for a Medical Marijuana License allowing them to acquire materials and commence planting seed crops, making them the 45th Licensed Producer in Canada and the 10th in British Columbia.

August 17, 2018, the company announced it had received its sales license from Health Canada, allowing it to begin on-boarding patients and ship cannabis products.

September 12, 2018, Tantalus Labs launched Tantalus Prime, its e-commerce membership program that provides door-to-door delivery directly from SunLab to registered customers. The five inaugural strains includes Blue Dream, Serratus, Skunk Haze, Harlequin, and Cannatonic.

In June 2023, Tantalus Labs announced that it would cease operations and began laying off the majority of its employees.

== Controversies ==
On May 22, 2015, prior to receiving their Medical Marijuana License, 150 residents of Maple Ridge protested the development of SunLab stating concerns around well water depletion and proximity to residential neighbourhoods. In response, Tantalus Labs licensed their well access with the BC Ministry of Forestry and committed to rainwater as its primary water source for irrigation.

== Environmental issues ==
Executive Dan Sutton has identified the carbon footprint associated with modern indoor growing techniques that rivals heavy industrial manufacturing.

== Political advocacy ==
Tantalus Labs and Hanway Associates produced and shared a policy guidance document with 19 BC Ministries and representatives on September 18, 2017. This document provided context and recommendations around the legal age of consumption, Retail Licensing, Supply Chain Management, Transparency and Reporting, and Ancillary Industries. Receiving no response, Tantalus Labs published this document so that the citizens of British Columbia can hold elected officials to their obligation to foster the cannabis industry and its impactful cultural history. This was the second policy guidance document produced in collaboration with Hanway Associates.
