= Papa & Barkley =

American cannabis company

Papa & Barkley is an American cannabis company based in California, that develops and markets products derived from tetrahydrocannabinol (THC) and cannabidiol (CBD). The company uses solventless, whole-plant infusion processes and focuses on pain relief, sleep, and general wellness. Its products are distributed in California's regulated cannabis market, New York's regulated cannabis market, and nationally through hemp-derived CBD lines.

== History ==
Papa & Barkley was founded in 2016 by Adam Grossman in Eureka, California. Grossman developed the company's first product, later branded as Releaf Balm, as a home remedy to ease his father's severe back pain. The formulation, made in a crockpot, became the foundation for the company's wellness product line.

The company's name references Grossman's father ("Papa") and the family dog ("Barkley"), symbolizing its personal origins. Grossman partnered with cannabis formulator Guy Rocourt, who became Chief Product Officer and later CEO, to expand production using solventless methods.

In January 2021, Papa & Barkley appointed Evelyn Wang, a former L'Oréal and Estée Lauder executive, as CEO. She led the company through product expansion and brand positioning efforts until early 2022, when Rocourt was promoted to CEO. In 2024, the company was acquired by Mammoth Distribution, one of California's largest cannabis distributors and owner of the Heavy Hitters cannabis brand, marking a significant consolidation in the state's cannabis market.

== Products and methods ==
Papa & Barkley develops two main product categories:

- THC line – sold in California dispensaries, including topicals, tinctures, capsules, edibles, and concentrates.
- CBD line – distributed nationally, formulated with hemp-derived CBD under the 2018 Farm Bill. Available online and through national retailers such as Vitamin Shoppe and Thrive Market.

The company uses solventless extraction methods, such as lipid infusion and rosin pressing, avoiding chemical solvents to preserve cannabinoids and terpenes.

In 2021, Papa & Barkley launched its Sleep Releaf Collection, a CBN-infused product line including capsules, tinctures, gummies and chocolates. A company-run home-use study with 90 participants reported an 80% improvement in sleep quality.

== Leadership ==
- Adam Grossman – founder and former CEO, credited with the company's initial product development
- Guy Rocourt – co-founder, former Chief Product Officer, and CEO (2022–2024), who promotes whole-plant medicine
- Evelyn Wang – CEO (2021–2022), previously an executive in the beauty industry, who positioned Papa & Barkley as a wellness brand while expanding its product lines.

== Recognition ==
Forbes described the company as part of the rise of "luxury cannabis" in California. Cannabis Business Times and GreenState have highlighted its leadership transitions and patient-centered ethos.

Papa & Barkley has also been featured in industry analyses for its use of customer data to research product efficacy.

The company has also been a multiple-time award winner at the Emerald Cup, recognized for its solventless extracts and edibles. At the 2025 California State Fair, it won the top wellness brand award (the “Golden Bear”), as well as awards for its sleep capsules, tinctures, and the Active Releaf Balm.

== See also ==
- Cannabis in California
- Medical cannabis in the United States
- List of cannabis companies
