= CanniMed =

Canadian public licensed producer of medical cannabis

CanniMed Therapeutics Inc.
- Type: Subsidiary
- Traded as: TSX: CMED
- Industry: Medical Cannabis
- Founded: 1988; 38 years ago
- Founder: Brent Zettl
- Headquarters: Saskatoon, Saskatchewan, Canada
- Area served: Canada
- Products: Medical cannabis
- Parent: Aurora Cannabis
- Website: www.cannimed.ca

CanniMed Therapeutics Inc. is a Canadian public licensed producer of medical cannabis. It is primarily focused on cannabis oil. The company's predecessor, Prairie Plant Systems, was established in 1988 and is located in Saskatoon, Saskatchewan. In 2013 CanniMed became the first cannabis producer to be licensed under Health Canada regulations that were issued that year. It went public in 2016, and in March 2018 almost all of its stock was acquired by a rival producer, Aurora Cannabis, following a hostile takeover to which company management finally consented.

== History ==
The predecessor to CanniMed, Prairie Plant Systems, was established in 1988. PPS began its business by providing fruit trees to orchards. Fruit products include Saskatoon berries, haskap (blue honeysuckle) and dwarf sour cherries. In 1990, it entered a joint venture with Hudbay to establish an underground growth chamber in the Trout Lake mine in Flin Flon, Manitoba.

In 2000, PPS received a contract from Health Canada to grow medical cannabis. It used its facility in Flin Flon for this purpose. From that time until 2013, PPS was the only company given a Health Canada license to grow cannabis, although as of 2012 only 12% of medical cannabis users used PPS, with most of the rest growing their own cannabis. In 2000 PPS set up a US subsidiary called SubTerra, and in 2003, it acquired the White Pine mine in Michigan, for use in bio-pharmaceutical research. In 2009, PPR lost its lease to the Flin Flon facility when a deposit of zinc was discovered below it, and so the company built its first above-ground cannabis growing facility.

In 2012, PPS through SubTerra announced its intention to grow medical cannabis in its Michigan mine, based on the 2008 legalization of medical cannabis in Michigan. In 2014 SubTerra bought an Upper Michigan power company in order to secure energy supply to its research facilities.

In 2013, Health Canada changed its medical cannabis regulations, banning in-home production and opening up commercial production to additional companies, and that year PPS and its new subsidiary CanniMed Ltd. became first producers to be certified under the regulations.

In June 2015 CanniMed received Health Canada approval for clinical trial of cannabis in adults with osteoarthritis of the knee. In January 2016, CanniMed received Health Canada approval to sell edible cannabis oil. On December 29, 2016, it held an IPO on the Toronto Stock Exchange, raising $69 million. The new public company was named CanniMed Therapeutics, and had Cannimed Ltd. and Prairie Plant Systems as subsidiaries. In March 2017, it announced a deal to distribute its products with PharmaChoice, a Canadian co-operative pharmacy chain. In April 2017, it announced a $10 million expansion of its facility in Saskatoon.

== Acquisition ==
In November 2017, Aurora Cannabis started trying to acquire CanniMed, and claimed it had the support of 38% of shareholders. CanniMed management responded by rejecting the offer, and proposing an alternative merger with Newstrike Resources, a recreational cannabis firm, instead. In January, Newstrike shareholders approved the proposed merger, but CanniMed management started to reconsider Aurora's offer. In January 2018, Cannimed called off its proposed acquisition of Newstrik and agreed to be bought by Aurora for $1.1 billion in stock and cash to create a larger company than the industry leader at the time, Canopy Growth Corporation. Aurora had put out an offer to buy CanniMed's stock from its holders for cash and Aurora stock; the offer terminated at the end of March and by that time Aurora owned around 96% of CanniMed stock, and had paid out around 69.3 million of its shares and $134 million in cash. Aurora said at that time that it would compel the remaining shareholders to sell their stock and would formally absorb CanniMed at a later date. In April 2018 the CEO of CanniMed, Brent Zettl, resigned and Andre Jerome was appointed interim CEO. Around the time of acquisition CanniMed's stock price rose dramatically as people anticipated the legalization of cannabis in Canada in the summer of 2018, raising concerns about a bubble.

In June 2020, Aurora cannabis announced the closure of the Saskatoon facility.

== See also ==
- Mamedica
