= Steve DeAngelo =

American cannabis rights activist

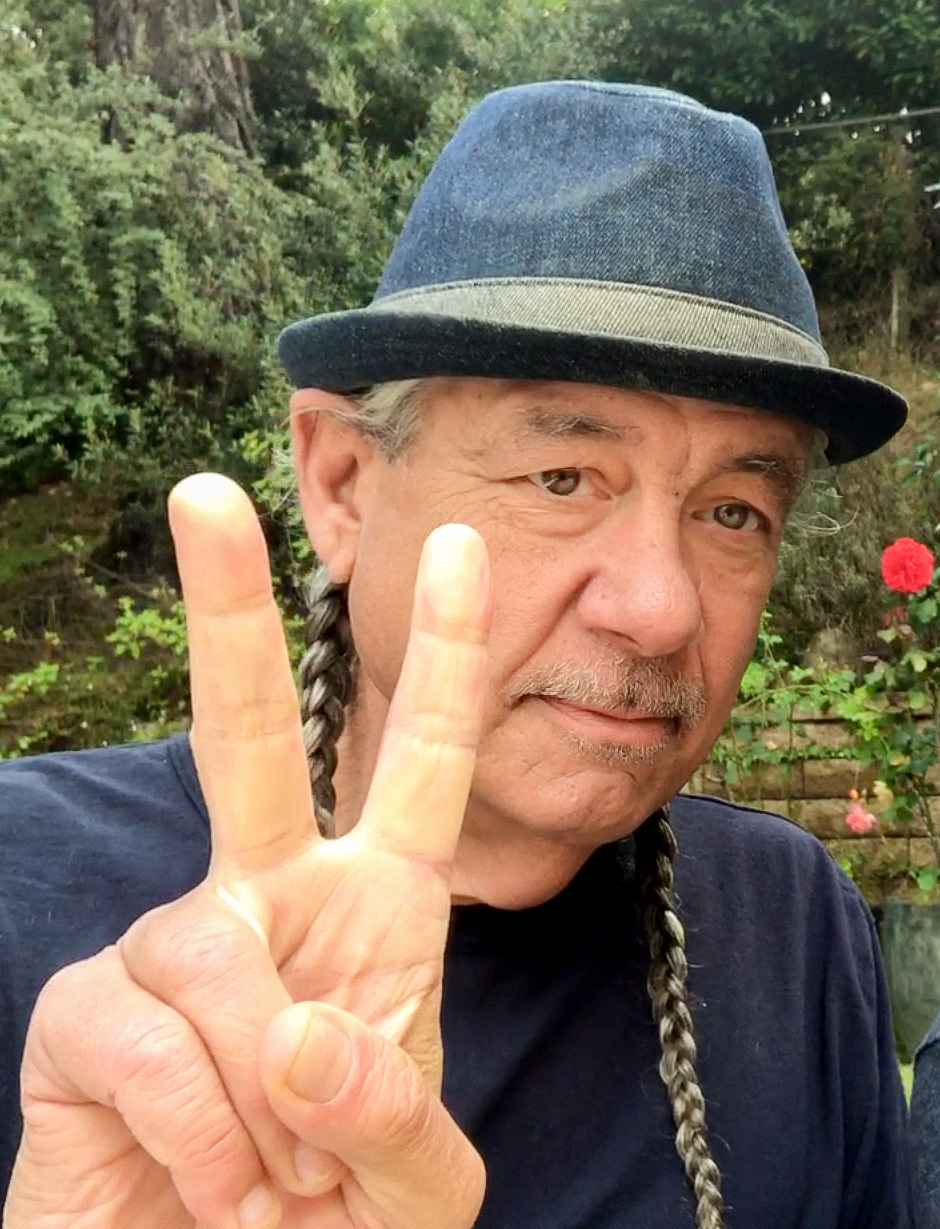
- Steve DeAngelo, a prominent cannabis rights advocate, flashing a peace sign.
- Born: June 12, 1958 (age 68); Philadelphia, Pennsylvania, U.S.
- Education: University of Maryland
- Occupation: Cannabis rights advocate
- Website: stevedeangelo.com

Steve DeAngelo (born June 12, 1958) is an American activist and advocate for the cannabis reform in the United States.

== Career ==
Steve DeAngelo is the co-founder and chairman emeritus of Harborside Inc., a medical cannabis dispensary operator publicly listed on the Canadian Securities Exchange. Founded in 2006 as a non-profit medical cannabis dispensary, Harborside Health Center served over 300,000 registered patients by 2019.

He co-founded Steep Hill, Inc., one of the earliest commercial cannabis testing laboratories in the United States, and Arcview Group, an investment network focused on the cannabis industry. DeAngelo formerly served Arcview as vice president.

Harborside was the subject of Weed Wars, a reality series which aired on the Discovery Channel.

DeAngelo is the author of The Cannabis Manifesto: A New Paradigm for Wellness.

== Last Prisoner Project ==
In 2019, together with Dean Raise and his brother Andrew DeAngelo, he co-founded the Last Prisoner Project, a nonprofit organization advocating for the release and support of individuals incarcerated for cannabis offenses.

== Activism ==
During his teenage years, DeAngelo attended anti-war demonstrations and later left high school to join the Youth International Party (Yippies). He served for ten years as lead organizer of Washington, D.C.’s annual Fourth of July Smoke-In. In the 1980s, he opened the Anchor Club in Washington, D.C., which became a meeting place for cannabis and peace activists during the presidential administrations of Ronald Reagan and George H. W. Bush. These activists included William Kunstler, Wavy Gravy, and author Jack Herer, who DeAngelo helped in editing and publishing the manuscript for his book, The Emperor Wears No Clothes.

DeAngelo became a lead organizer of the first Hemp Museum and Hemp Tour. In the 1990s, his company Ecolution manufactured hemp-based clothing and accessories, distributing products across the United States and in 21 international markets.

== Bibliography ==
- DeAngelo, Steve (2015). The Cannabis Manifesto: A New Paradigm for Wellness. North Atlantic Books. p. 230. ISBN 978-1583949375.
