= Delta 3 greenhouse =

Cannabis greenhouse in Canada

- Interactive map of the Delta 3 greenhouse area
- Alternative names: Pure Sunfarms

General information
- Type: Greenhouse
- Location: East Ladner, British Columbia
- Coordinates: 49.084°N 123.002°W
- Owner: Village Farms International

Technical details
- Floor area: 1,100,000 sq ft (100,000 m^{2})

Delta 3 greenhouse in East Ladner, southwest British Columbia, may be the world's largest cannabis greenhouse. As of 2018, the greenhouse is owned by Pure Sunfarms, a wholly owned subsidiary of Village Farms International. In early 2018, it was licensed to expand to 1,100,000 square feet (100,000 m^{2}) (25 acres), enough to produce 75 metric tons of cannabis annually. The company owning the greenhouse has options to expand to another two greenhouses; combined they would produce 300 metric tons per year, equal to roughly half of Canada's entire recreational cannabis consumption at the time nationwide legalization commenced in 2018.

The Delta 3 greenhouse was originally built and operated by Canagro Produce Ltd. and Century Pacific Greenhouses Ltd. to grow vegetables. The site was purchased by Hot House Growers in 2003 and then taken over by Village Farms in 2006 in a merger that created one of North America's largest greenhouse growers. In 2017 Village Farms announced plans to enter the legal cannabis market by converting the Delta greenhouses through a joint venture with Emerald Health Therapeutics called Pure Sunfarms. Due to financial difficulties at Emerald, in September 2020 Village Farms reached an agreement to buy the remaining stake of Pure Sunfarms. As a result, all Delta greenhouses returned to Village Farms ownership.

== See also ==
- Tweed Farms, Ontario: Canada's largest cannabis greenhouse in 2014
