= PharmaChoice =

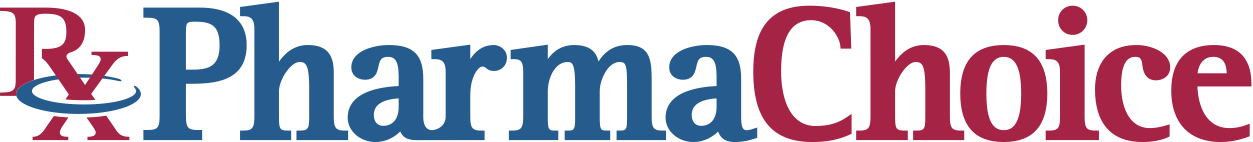
PharmaChoice Logo

PharmaChoice Canada Inc is a member-owned cooperative of Canadian pharmacies headquartered in Dartmouth, Nova Scotia and Saskatoon, Saskatchewan. It represents more than 1000 independent pharmacies across Canada, generating more than $2B in retail sales.

== History ==
PharmaChoice was founded in 1999 by Calvin LeRoux and partners.
