= Mamedica =

British medical cannabis clinic

Mamedica is a London, UK-based medical cannabis clinic which was founded in 2021 and launched in 2022 by Jon Robson. It is one of four UK clinics licensed to prescribe and dispense medical cannabis.

== History ==
In August 2022, it published a survey of 4,000 people which found that 60% of British people would consider using cannabis to treat medical conditions, particularly if prescribed by a doctor. A February 2023 survey for Mamedica found a third of respondents would use medical marijuana to help treat depression.

In June 2023, Mamedica announced a strategic UK partnership with Canadian medical cannabis products supplier 4C Labs.

The clinic has reported a 400% increase in patients since it was founded. Robson says the clinic aims "to offer an alternative to conventional medicines to individuals who are struggling with a severe medical condition and desire to regain a sense of normalcy in their daily lives".

Mamedica is a member of the UK's Cannabis Industry Council.

In September 2025, it raised a £4.5M round of funding from Casa Verde Capital.

== Patient conditions ==
Since June 2022, 40% of Mamedica's prescriptions have been for mental health conditions, including anxiety, depression, stress, insomnia and post-traumatic stress disorder. In 2023, Mamedica reported an increase in demand from patients suffering from psychiatric conditions and opting to use medical cannabis as a replacement for traditional medication that can cause side effects.

In addition, the clinic prescribes CBD to support patients with menopause symptoms like hot flushes, and the clinic supports patients living with chronic neurological pain, with bespoke cannabis-based prescription medicines (CBPMs) that improve individuals' overall quality of life by reducing symptoms of depression and anxiety.

== Eligibility for treatment ==
While more than 89,000 private medical cannabis prescriptions have been made in the UK, there have been fewer than five medical cannabis prescriptions via the NHS. UK legislation states that a prescription for medical cannabis can only be initiated by a specialist consultant on the General Medical Council (GMC) register. Before patients can book a Mamedica consultation, they need to have tried at least two licensed medications or treatments and must not have any history of schizophrenia or psychosis. Patients must provide their medical records and details about their family medical history to mitigate any potential risks of using CBPMs.

== Treatment prescriptions ==
Mamedica doctors can prescribe CBPMs including THC, Cannabidiol (CBD) and balanced cannabis profiles and cannabis flower, oil, capsules and cartridges for patients living with chronic conditions. Mamedica's cannabis flower prescriptions are strictly for use in dry-herb vaporisers, devices that let patients heat the flower and inhale its contents as a vapour.

== See also ==
- Tikun Olam (cannabis)
