= Arcadia Biosciences =

Company based in the state of California, United States

- Type: Public
- Traded as: Nasdaq: RKDA
- Industry: agricultural biotechnology
- Founded: 2002
- Headquarters: Davis, California, United States
- Area served: Worldwide
- Key people: Matthew Plavan (Chief Executive Officer)
- Products: GoodWheat™
- Revenue: ▲US$4.03 million; (FY DEC 31 2017)
- Number of employees: 42
- Website: arcadiabio.com

Arcadia Biosciences (Nasdaq: RKDA) is a publicly traded American agricultural biotechnology headquartered in Davis, California focused on the development of traits to enhance crop quality and productivity. The company is partly owned by Moral Compass Corporation.

It has developed a reduced-gluten and enhanced starch variety of wheat under the name GoodWheat. Arcadia also has a joint venture with Bioceres called Verdeca, which has developed and is commercializing HB4 technology in soybeans that gained FDA approval in 2017. HB4 soybeans have increased yield up to 30% while being more resistant to abiotic stress such as drought.
