= Diego Pellicer =

American Cannabis company

- Company type: Public company
- Traded as: Expert Market: DPWW
- Industry: Cannabis
- Founder: Jamen Shively
- Headquarters: Seattle, Washington

Diego Pellicer Worldwide Inc. is a Seattle-based company which has a premium brand of cannabis. It is a publicly traded company that sells cannabis products over the counter. The company was founded by Jamen Shively who named it after his great-grandfather. Ron Throgmartin is the CEO of the company.

In May 2013, the owner of Diego Pellicer expressed a desire to establish a national chain of marijuana dispensaries. In October 2019, the company announced letters of intent to purchase retail, manufacturing, and cultivation properties in Colorado.
