= Tweed Farms =

- Logo of Tweed Farms
- Interactive map of the Tweed Farms area

General information
- Type: Greenhouse
- Location: Niagara-on-the-Lake, Ontario, Canada
- Coordinates: 43.1683°N 79.1195°W
- Owner: Canopy Growth Corporation

Technical details
- Floor area: 1,000,000 sq ft (93,000 m^{2})

Design and construction
- Main contractor: Havecon (2017–2018 expansion)

Tweed Farms in Niagara-on-the-Lake, Ontario was the world's largest legal cannabis greenhouse in 2014. At that time, it had 350,000 square feet (33,000 m^{2}) of indoor space. It is owned by Canopy Growth Corporation, a publicly traded Canadian company. In 2017 the company received a license to expand to c. 1,000,000 square feet (93,000 m^{2}) of space, to be ready for production by April 2018.

In November 2021, Canopy Growth Corporation shut down Tweed Farms as the company struggled with profitability. As a result of the closure, 30 staff were laid off and 60 staff would be relocated to other indoor facilities in Kincardine, Ontario and Smiths Falls, Ontario.

== See also ==
- Delta 3 greenhouse, British Columbia: Canada's largest cannabis greenhouse
