= Cannabis Corner =

First city-owned cannabis shop in Washington, US

Coordinates: 45°38′31″N 121°59′05″W

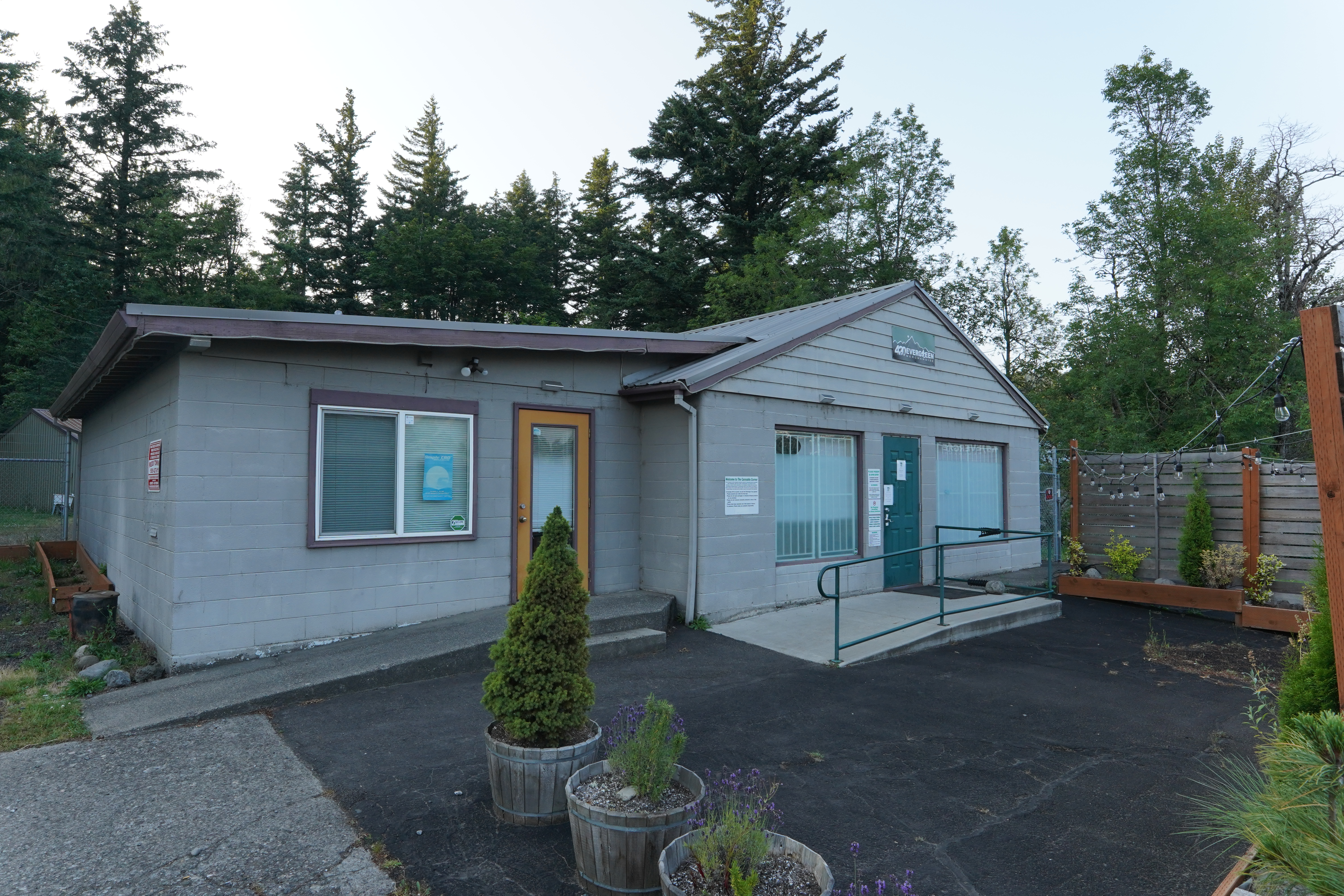
- Stevenson, WA, location
- Type: Shop
- Industry: Cannabis
- Founded: March 7, 2015; 11 years ago
- Headquarters: 420 Evergreen Dr., North Bonneville, WA, USA
- Website: Official website

Cannabis Corner is the first city-owned cannabis shop with its first location at 420 Evergreen Drive, North Bonneville, Washington, USA. As of 2020, the main storefront is located in Stevenson, Washington.

== History ==
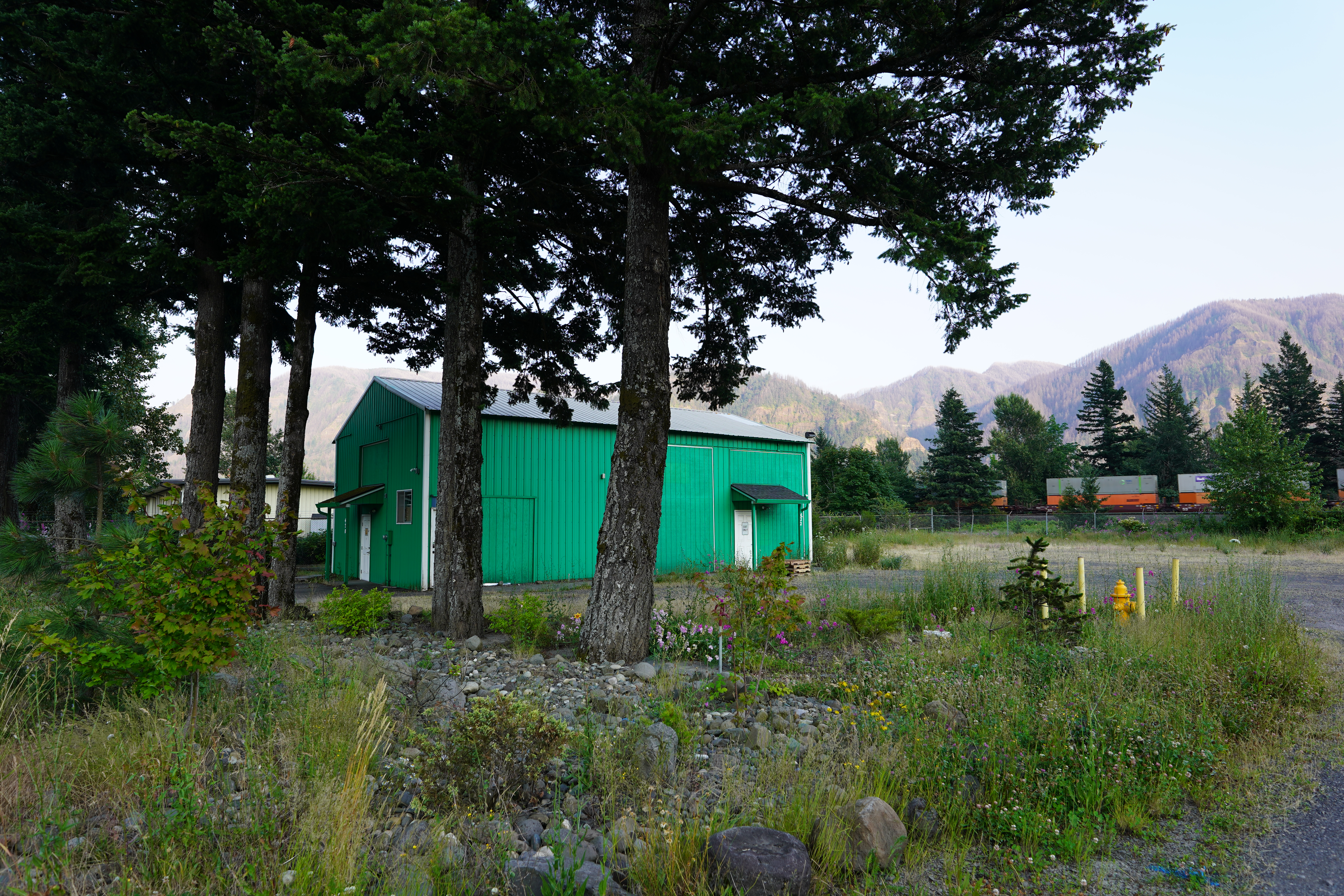
The original location in North Bonneville, WA

The store opened on March 7, 2015, and held its grand opening ceremony the weekend of April 20, 2015. Activities included vendor demonstrations and an open house hosted by the city of North Bonneville with staff from Cannabis Corner and Skamania County's chamber of commerce.

Despite receiving national attention during its opening, the shop was reportedly struggling financially by May 2015. By September 2016, Cannabis Corner had generated $2.2 million in revenue.

As of 2019, Cannabis Corner is located in Stevenson, Washington
