= Marley Natural =

- Industry: Cannabis
- Headquarters: Seattle, Washington, United States
- Parent: Privateer Holdings
- Website: marleynatural.com

Marley Natural is the official cannabis brand of Bob Marley, developed by his estate in conjunction with the private equity firm Privateer Holdings, which develops cannabis industry brands. The brand is based in Seattle, Washington.

Marley Natural offers three categories of goods: cannabis (whole flower, pre-rolls, and oil cartridges), body care products, and lifestyle accessories including smoking accessories. Marley Natural body care and smoking accessories are available online and at select retailers across the United States. Cannabis is available in California, Oregon, and Washington state. The brand launched in February 2016 on the 71st anniversary of Bob Marley's birthday and celebrated the event at an exclusive event in the Hollywood Hills that was featured in Rolling Stone magazine.

Marley Natural has a social impact program, Rise Up, that supports philanthropic groups in the United States and Jamaica. In August 2016 Marley Natural hosted an event in Oregon that paid the legal fees of men and women applying to expunge non-violent cannabis convictions from their criminal records and connected them with legal volunteers to aid in the applications.

According to the BBC, Marley's daughter, Cedella Marley is the spokesman for the new company. Many other members of the Marley family have been involved with the company including Stephen Marley, Rohan Marley and Donisha Prendergast.

The Guardian noted disquiet about the use of Marley's name as a cannabis brand, commenting that recreating him as the "Marlboro Man of Marijuana" was a "cynical, money-generating move". They also noted that Marley is already ranked fifth on Forbes's list of top-earning dead celebrities, earning about US$20 million a year for his estate. Cedella and other members of the Marley family have responded to these claims in the press. "My dad would be so happy to see people understanding the healing power of the herb," she said in a statement.

== See also ==
- List of celebrities who own cannabis businesses
- Willie's Reserve
