= The Hempest =

American hemp clothing store

- Company type: Private
- Industry: Retail
- Founded: 1995
- Headquarters: Boston, Massachusetts, US
- Products: Clothing, footwear, jewelry, food, health products
- Website: hempest.com

The Hempest is an American eco-friendly clothing store specializing in hemp clothing, products, and accessories. The store was founded in 1995 in Boston, Massachusetts, which makes it the oldest cannabis shop in Massachusetts. The foundation of the store was a conviction to "bringing hemp back to the marketplace and into full view of the public". Though the stores typically work together, each is independent from one another.

The mission of the store has been to continually educate the public on the hypocrisy of the drug war while at the same time providing eco-friendly fashion alternatives made from Hemp. The Hempest has been educating Boston and selling books about CBD since 1997. The Massachusetts campaigned heavily for legalized Medicinal and recreational Cannabis, and worked directly with the Marijuana Policy Project in fundraising efforts and signature drives.

== Store history ==
- Boston, Massachusetts, opened December 1995 on Huntington Avenue, moved July 1997 to Newbury Street
- Burlington, Vermont, opened July 2000; closed November 2015
- Northampton, Massachusetts, opened October 2001
- Cambridge, Massachusetts, opened April 2006 in Harvard Square; closed 2020
- Bellingham, Washington, opened December 2007; closed December 2009
- Online store opened April 2004
