= BZAM =

Canadian cannabis industry company

BZAM Ltd.
- Formerly: The Green Organic Dutchman Holdings Ltd.
- Traded as: CSE: BZAM
- ISIN: CA12464X1015
- Industry: Recreational cannabis
- Founders: Scott Skinner & Jeannette Vandermarel
- Headquarters: Mississauga, Ontario, Canada
- Website: https://bzam.com/

BZAM Ltd., formerly The Green Organic Dutchman Holdings Ltd. (TGOD), is a Canadian recreational cannabis company headquartered in Mississauga, Ontario. TGOD's initial public offering on the Toronto Stock Exchange (TSX), completed on May 2, 2018, was the industry's largest to date, and raised over CAD$115 million. In September 2021, the company's stock moved from the TSX to the Canadian Securities Exchange. The CSE suspended trading of BZAM's stocks on May 8, 2024 pursuant to a cease trade order from the Ontario Securities Commission, and BZAM was delisted from the CSE in 2024.

== Valleyfield greenhouse ==
Green Organic Dutchman's Valleyfield greenhouse is an 820,000-square-foot (76,000 m^{2}) facility on Boulevard Gérard-Cadieux in Valleyfield, Quebec (45.234°N 74.106°W). Power rates the company secured were reported to be 4 cents per kilowatt-hour, attributed to the nearby Beauharnois Hydroelectric Generating Station. The greenhouse, when completed, will be over twice the area of Tweed Farms, Canada's largest cannabis greenhouse in 2014. The Valleyfield greenhouse completed construction in 2020 but was eventually sold to Cannara Biotech in 2021 for $27 million as a result of The Green Organic Dutchman’s need to repay creditors.
