= Leafbuyer =

American cannabis marketing technology company

Leafbuyer Technologies, Inc.
- Type: Public company
- Traded as: OTC Markets: LBUY
- Industry: Cannabis; Marketing
- Founded: 2012
- Founders: Kurt Rossner; Michael Goerner; Mark Breen
- Headquarters: Greenwood Village, Colorado, U.S.
- Area served: United States
- Key people: Kurt Rossner (CEO); Michael Goerner (CTO); Mark Breen (COO)
- Products: Leafbuyer.com
- Website: www.leafbuyer.com

Leafbuyer Technologies, Inc. is an American cannabis marketing technology company based in Greenwood Village, Colorado. It operates Leafbuyer.com, an online directory of cannabis deals and coupons that connects dispensaries and cannabis brands with medical and recreational consumers.

== Background ==
Leafbuyer was conceptualized in November 2012, after the passing of Colorado Amendment 64, which legalized the medical and recreational use of cannabis in the state. Notable developments since that time include partnerships with The Cannabist (owned by the Denver Post) in August 2016, Westword in December 2016, and Voice Media Group (owner of LA Weekly, Phoenix New Times, and Toke of the Town) in September 2017. In Q2 of 2017, the company became publicly traded on the OTCQB marketplace under the ticker LBUY. In June 2019, Leafbuyer opened a satellite office in Los Angeles.

== Business Model ==
Leafbuyer offers customer loyalty and retention platforms, display advertising, and listing packages to cannabis companies, including product companies, dispensaries, head shops, and grow stores. Primary services include listings on Leafbuyer.com and direct outreach to consumers through email and texting.
