= Openvape =

Personal vaporizer device manufacturer

O.penVAPE
- Company type: Medical marijuana
- Industry: Manufacturing
- Founded: 2010
- Founder: Jeremy Heidl, Ralph Morgan, Christopher McElvany
- Headquarters: Denver, Colorado, United States
- Area served: Colorado, California, Oregon, Arizona, Nevada, Connecticut, Maine, Massachusetts, Vermont, New Mexico, Jamaica, Czech Republic, France, Netherlands, United Kingdom, Canada, Poland, Ireland, Scotland, and South Africa
- Key people: Ralph Morgan, Jeremy Heidl, Chris Driessen, Chris McElvany
- Products: Medical cannabis, electronic cigarette
- Website: www.openvape.com www.organalabs.com

Openvape (stylized as O.penVAPE) is a manufacturer and distributor of personal vaporizer devices which make use of herbal extract oil-filled cartridges. Founded in 2012, the company is headquarter in Denver, Colorado. It sells products at many retail locations across a distribution network of licensed affiliates in the United States, Jamaica, Czech Republic, France, Netherlands, United Kingdom, Canada, Poland, Ireland, Scotland and South Africa.

O.penVAPE licenses its intellectual property to eleven distribution partners in ten states and Jamaica. Licensees employ O.penVAPE's Organa Labs technology and proprietary processes to manufacture cannabis oil using supercritical CO_{2} extraction.

== History ==
O.penVAPE's premium line of Craft RESERVE cartridges won the first place prize for Best Vape Pen Cartridge in the High Times 2016 Colorado Cannabis Cup competition.

In Europe, O.penVAPE branded products, with the exception of the Organa Labs cannabis line, are available in the Czech Republic, France, the Netherlands and the United Kingdom.

O.penVAPE is a founding member of the National Cannabis Industry Association.

The Denver Department of Environmental Health appointed Ralph Morgan, CEO of O.penVAPE, to serve on its Cannabis Sustainability Work Group, in December 2015, to determine best practices and develop other educational resources for the industry.

In May 2016, the company submitted a bid to assume the naming rights of the Denver Broncos' stadium after Sports Authority declared bankruptcy.
