= Steep Hill (company) =

Cannabis testing, analytics and research laboratory

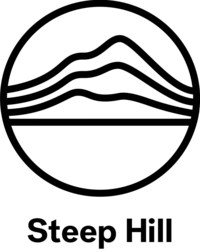
- Industry: Cannabis testing
- Founded: 2007
- Headquarters: Berkeley, California
- Parent: Canbud Distribution Corp.
- Website: https://www.steephill.com/

Steep Hill, INC. is a California-based medical cannabis and adult-use cannabis testing, analytics, and research laboratory that opened in late 2007. It was the first commercial medical cannabis testing lab to open in the United States.

== Founding ==
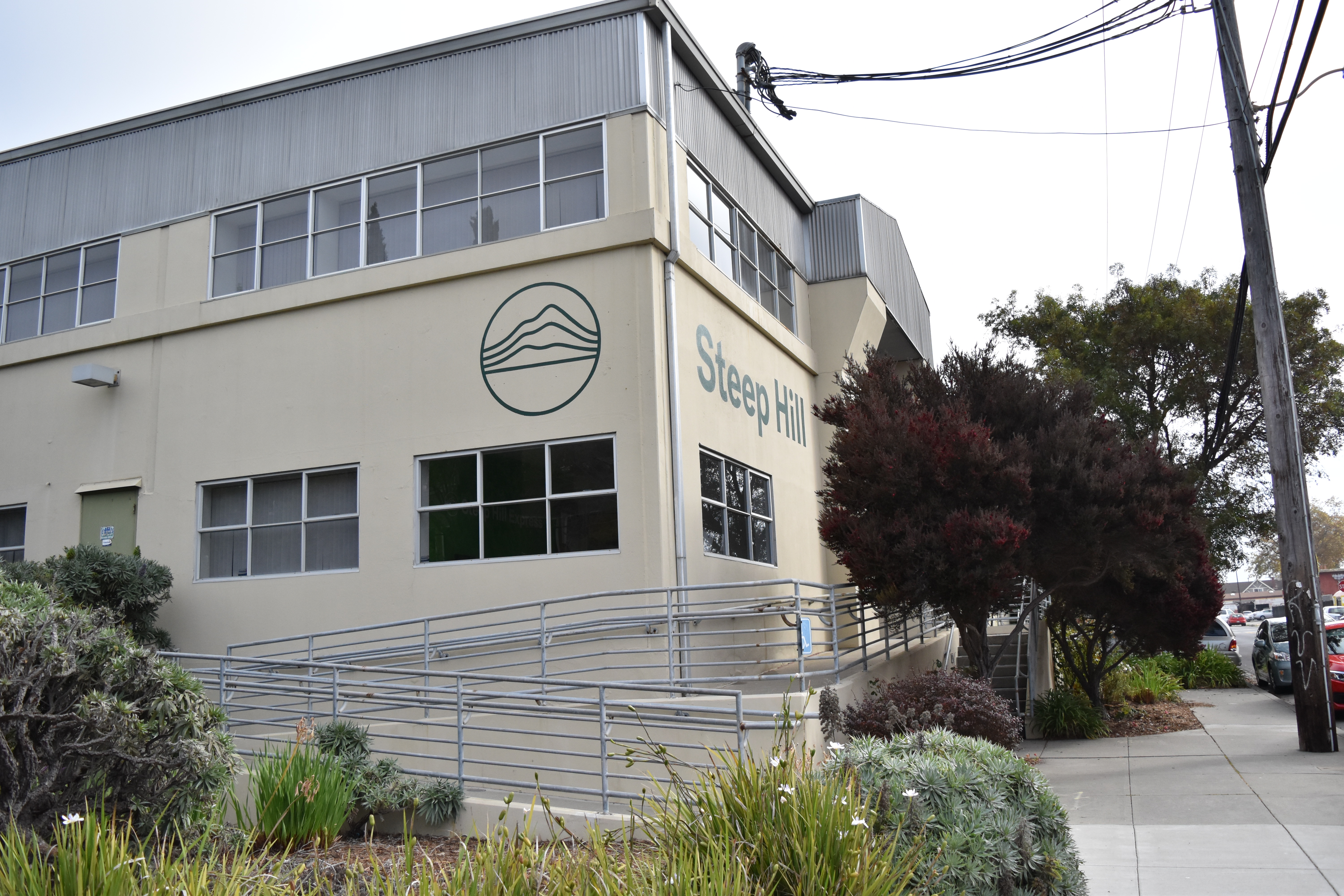

Steep Hill was founded by David Lampach, Addison DeMoura, and Steve DeAngelo in 2007. In accordance with California Proposition 215 (1996) and California's Prop. 64 Adult Use of Marijuana Act regulations, Steep Hill routinely analyzes samples from the California medical and adult-use cannabis markets for signs of active compounds, microbiological contamination, residual solvents and pesticides. The lab uses Shimadzu equipment for gas chromatography. Steep Hill has advocated for strict safety and quality testing regulations in the cannabis industry.

== Products ==
The lab is known for of its QuantaCann and QuantaCann2 systems, the first instant onsite potency analysis systems in the medical cannabis industry. QuantaCann is on-site potency and moisture machinery providing important analytical information from cannabis samples in 60 seconds. The QuantaCann machinery was featured in the 2014 episode of CSI: Vegas, "Buzz Kill" as the scientific equipment used to solve a murder in a dispensary. In addition, Steep Hill Labs created GenKits, a genetics kit used for identifying various cannabis strains. It has been primarily used for young seedlings so that growers may identify young male plants. With this information growers are able to use additional genetic testing for traits to determine whether or not to remove them from their yields. Cannabis cultivators use GenKit for the classification, documentation, and safeguarding of cannabis varietals. The lab complements this with programs that seek to identify specific THCA and CBDA content in plants. Other Steep Hill products include their Phenosight™ products, which guide marker-assisted breeding programs in developing cannabis strains with desirable traits, and Strain Fingerprint, quantifying the average concentrations of the twelve most common cannabinoids and terpenoids found in cannabis strains.

== History & Timeline ==
=== 2011 ===
Steep Hill was selected to serve as a Mendocino County 9.31 inspector. The company inspected cannabis gardens in order to establish compliance with County law.

=== 2013 ===
Steep Hill served on a team that was contracted to consult the Washington State Liquor and Cannabis Board on implementation of its adult-use legal cannabis program.

In July 2013, Steep Hill Lab Inc. merged with Halent Scientific Inc. to form Steep Hill Halent Lab Inc.

=== 2014 ===
In November 2014, Steep Hill and University of Technology Jamaica signed a Memorandum of Understanding, initiating a three-year partnership. This partnership furthers advanced research efforts to examine the scientific and medicinal properties and potential of the cannabis plant with the acquisition of a Steep Hill's QuantaCann2 cannabis testing machinery.

Steep Hill expanded its lab locations to Washington state.

=== 2015 ===
Steep Hill announced a partnership with the cannabis lifestyle website Leafly for the debut of its Strain Fingerprint product.

Steep Hill expanded its lab locations to include New Mexico.

=== 2016 ===
Steep Hill announced significant East Coast expansion of licensee lab locations, including new locations in Pennsylvania, Washington, D.C., and Maryland, as well as into Alaska. The lab obtained approval to operate in Maryland in 2017.

During a 30-day period ending on Oct. 10, 2016, Steep Hill performed quantitative pesticide testing of California-produced cannabis samples, reporting that 84.3% of samples submitted tested positive for pesticide residue, failing to meet the criteria of Oregon's pesticide regulations.

Steep Hill adopts PathogenDx technology for performing commercial cannabis microbial testing to California requirements, deploying January 2017.

The work of Steep Hill's cannabis genomics research division was the subject of a 2016 profile in Wired magazine.

=== 2017 ===
In August 2017, Steep Hill closed a two million dollar funding round to support its 2018 growth.

Steep Hill's Dr. Reggie Gaudino, Ph.D., Vice President of Science, Genetics, and Intellectual Property, provided testimony before the Sixth Meeting Of the New Mexico Legislative Health and Human Services Committee, "There Is No FDA In Cannabis Testing, Therefore, Safe Cannabis for Patients is Left to the States States Must Respond on Behalf of Patients."

In November 2017, Steep Hill announced a strategic alliance with New Frontier Data to offer intelligence reporting, data analysis, technology, and scientific expertise to governmental agencies in European Union member countries.

Steep Hill Alaska, one of two testing labs in the state, reported inconsistencies in potency results from different labs, resulting in the formation of a committee to look at issues regarding the testing of cannabis products in Alaska.

Through a partnership with Canada's First Nations Pontiac Group, Steep Hill expands to offer full service cannabis testing and quality assurance to Canada.
