= MedMen =

American cannabis company

- Type: Public
- Industry: Cannabis
- Founded: 2010
- Founder: Adam Bierman; Andrew Modlin
- Defunct: April 26, 2024; 2 years ago
- Fate: Bankruptcy and Liquidation
- Headquarters: California, United States
- Revenue: ▲$130 Million(2019)
- Number of employees: 1,000
- Website: medmen.com

MedMen Enterprises was a United States-based cannabis company. At its peak, it had operations in California, Nevada, Arizona, Florida, Illinois, New York, and Massachusetts. MedMen owns and operates 29 retail stores and 6 cultivation facilities and is currently licensed to expand its footprint to 65 retail locations. Its stock began trading on the Canadian Securities Exchange under the ticker symbol MMEN in 2018. The CSE suspended trading of MedMen's stocks on January 8, 2024 pursuant to cease trade orders from the Ontario Securities Commission and British Columbia Securities Commission, and the stocks were delisted on May 16, 2024. MedMen was also traded over-the-counter in the United States under the ticker symbol MMNFF. MedMen is based in Culver City, California and has more than 1,000 employees.

== History ==
MedMen was co-founded in 2010 by Adam Bierman and Andrew Modlin. In an interview with Green Entrepreneur, the pair said they saw a business opportunity in the emerging cannabis industry and a chance to "redefine society's relationship with cannabis". In 2018, MedMen West Hollywood was one of the first cannabis retail stores to open in California after the state's recreational cannabis laws went into effect. MedMen opened its first branded retail outlets in New York and in Nevada in 2018, and opened its first medical marijuana dispensary in Florida in 2019.

In April 2018, the company opened MedMen Mustang, a 45,000 square-foot greenhouse and manufacturing facility near Reno, Nevada with expectations of producing 10,000 pounds of cannabis annually.

In May 2018, MedMen began construction on a second 45,000-square-foot cannabis factory in Desert Hot Springs, California. It was scheduled to open in early 2019.

MedMen went public on the Canadian Stock Exchange via a reverse takeover (RTO). The company listed under the stock ticker symbol MMEN on May 29, 2018.

In June 2018, MedMen announced its acquisition of a nursery and retail license to build 25 stores in Florida.

In the second half of 2018, MedMen acquired dispensaries in Arizona, Northern California, and Illinois. The company also initiated a $682 million acquisition of PharmaCann, although the deal eventually fell through. The acquisition would have set a record for the largest U.S.-based cannabis company buyout. The board decided the money would be better spent in increasing market share naturally.

In February 2019, MedMen announced a relationship with Treehouse Real Estate Investment Trust (“Treehouse”), a cannabis-focused REIT that had raised $133 million to acquire properties from MedMen.

In 2019, MedMen former CFO, James Parker, filed a lawsuit claiming that he was wrongfully discharged; while MedMen's CEO and its board denied the claims, calling them baseless and asserting that they will prevail in court. On April 19, 2019, MedMen's Chief Operating Officer Ben Cook, general counsel Lisa Sergi Trager, and senior vice president of corporate communications Daniel Yi resigned. Parker's lawsuit's claims resulted in the New York Medical Cannabis Industry Association removing MedMen from its roster.

In May 2019, the Journal of the American Medical Association called for a "national evidence-based regulatory regime for marijuana marketing" citing MedMen's nationally broadcast health claims.

In June 2019, the Los Angeles Business Journal reported MedMen's cash burn rate $70 million per quarter as the company cut expenses by 20% from 2018 levels.

On February 1, 2020, Adam Bierman resigned as CEO and surrendered all of his Class A super voting shares. Ryan Lissack, MedMen's chief operating officer and chief technology officer, was appointed to serve as the interim CEO.

On March 30, 2020, MedMen announced it had appointed Tom Lynch as Interim Chief Executive Officer and Chief Restructuring Officer. He previously served as Interim Chief Executive Officer of David's Bridal and before that chairman and chief executive officer of Frederick's of Hollywood.

On April 26, 2024, MedMen announced that they have entered bankruptcy proceedings in Canada, and its CFO Amit Pandey resigned immediately after the announcement. MedMen USA filed for voluntary Chapter 7 bankruptcy liquidation and immediately discontinued all future operations permanently.

=== Funding ===
Prior to its Canadian Stock Exchange listing, MedMen raised approximately $110 million through a private placement at an implied enterprise valuation of $1.65 billion.

The company also raised nearly $200 million (debt and equity) from September 2018 through November 2018, but reported only $80 million in cash on hand at year-end. In March 2019, MedMen announced a $250 million convertible financing facility with Gotham Green Partners.

== Retail stores and facilities ==
As of fall 2019, MedMen operated 32 dispensaries serving both medical and recreational customers in Arizona, California, Illinois, Nevada, New York, and Florida.

On March 11, 2024, it was reported by several sources that Medmen had closed its operations everywhere except for in San Diego and near LA International Airport. The closures came not too long after the company's stock value dropped to zero, which lead to the ousting of their CEO and executive chairman.

== Business strategy ==
=== Domestic ===
MedMen West Hollywood was one of two licensed dispensaries operating in time for the start of legal recreational use in the Greater Los Angeles area on January 2, 2018.

According to the Bureau of Cannabis Control records, the first state license for a cannabis business in the city of Los Angeles went to MedMen Beverly Hills on January 19, 2018.

MedMen has opened eight stores in Florida to serve its medical marijuana market and plans to have nine stores open by the end of 2019.

=== International ===
In 2015, MedMen partnered with MedReleaf, a Canadian marijuana producer now known as Aurora Cannabis, to open opportunities for collaboration on "product development and market penetration" with MedReleaf CEO Neil Closner joining MedMen's board of advisors.

On March 19, 2018, MedMen announced its cross-border, joint-venture partnership with Canadian company, Cronos Group, called MedMen Canada.

=== Marketing and branding ===
In February 2019, the company released a video ad directed by Spike Jonze and narrated by Jesse Williams touting the "normalization" of cannabis usage in American culture and linking the practice to founding father George Washington. The ad also criticizes anti-cannabis sentiment and American drug war policy.

On July 19, 2019, the television animated comedy series South Park released a satirical video on YouTube to promote its fictional "Tegridy Farms" cannabis brand, which originated in a 2018 episode. Multiple publications have noted similarities between the South Park ad and MedMen's Spike Jonze-directed ad, both of which begin with scenes featuring America's Founding Fathers growing hemp, particularly George Washington.

== See also ==
- Cannabis in the United States
- Medical cannabis in the United States
- Legality of cannabis
