= Stiiizy =

Cannabis company in the U.S. state of California

- Logo
- Industry: Cannabis
- Headquarters: Los Angeles, California, United States

Stiiizy is the largest retail cannabis chain in the U.S. state of California. In 2025, Lester Black of SFGate said the company's growth "has turned it into a dominant force in American cannabis", calling it "a favorite in young, urban cannabis culture, with its budget-friendly products".

Stiiizy was the best-selling cannabis brand in the United States in 2025, according to Headset and BDSA. The business is based in downtown Los Angeles and operated 34 locations as of mid-2024.

James Kim is a co-founder and the chief executive officer. Shryne Group is the parent company.

In February 2025, the New York State Office of Cannabis Management began investigating Stiiizy and other companies are laundering marijuana in New York through a Long Island processor.

Stiiizy bought 12 California retail cannabis stores from Gold Flora on October 23, 2025, taking possession on December 8. According to Stiiizy president Tak Sato, this brought their total number of stores to 61.
