= Goodship =

Seattle-based cannabis business

- Founded: 2016; 10 years ago
- Founder: Jody Hall
- Headquarters: Seattle, Washington, United States
- Parent: Privateer Holdings
- Website: thegoodship.com

Goodship is a Seattle cannabis business, founded in 2016 by Jody Hall, a former Starbucks executive. Hall also founded Cupcake Royale, a six-location cupcake chain in Seattle.

Goodship's "Higher education" lecture series began in 2015. According to High Times, it's "like college, but you don't have to pretend you're not stoned."

The company was purchased in 2017 by Privateer Holdings, and in 2018, announced expansion into California.
