= Indiva =

Cannabis company in London, Ontario, Canada

Indiva Ltd
- Indiva logo
- Formerly: Rainmaker Resources Ltd
- Industry: Legal Cannabis
- Founders: Koby Smutylo, Max Marion, and Niel Marotta
- Headquarters: London, Ontario,

Indiva was a publicly traded company based in London, Ontario. They got delisted in June 2024. The company used to operate in the Canadian cannabis industry, producing and supplying cannabis and cannabis products for both the legal recreational and medical markets. Indiva was founded in 2015 by Koby Smutylo, Max Marion, and Niel Marotta.

== Products ==
Indiva used to produce and supply THC & CBD dried cannabis flower, pre-rolls, capsules and edibles.

== Partnerships ==
In April 2018, Indiva entered a licensed joint-venture with Deepcell and Ruby Edibles to produce cannabis-infused salt and sugar. Indiva also has relationships with Bhang chocolates and Wana gummies. In January 2019, Indiva completed an equity investment of 9.9% in Cannabis Retailer RetailGo (RGI).
