= Willie's Reserve =

Cannabis company

- Company type: Private
- Industry: Cannabis
- Founder: Willie Nelson
- Headquarters: United States
- Area served: United States
- Website: williesreserve.com

Willie's Reserve is a company started by singer-songwriter Willie Nelson in 2015. Nelson, a longtime supporter of marijuana legalization announced the launch of chain stores of the brand after marijuana was legalized in different states. The first stores were planned to be opened in the states where cannabis was legalized in 2016, with an expansion planned as other states follow.

== Overview ==
After marijuana was legalized in different parts of the United States, longtime activist Willie Nelson announced in 2015 through spokesman Michael Bowman the establishment of his own marijuana brand, Willie's Reserve. Plans to open chain stores in the states where marijuana was legalized were announced, to be expanded state-to-state if marijuana legalization is further expanded. Bowman called the brand "a culmination of (Nelson's) vision, and his whole life". Bowman compared the concept of Willie's Reserve to Whole Foods Market, with the stores planned to carry their own brand of marijuana, while also featuring products by local growers.

During an interview with Rolling Stone Nelson explained that the stores would feature a "menu" explaining the effects produced by each type of product sold in the store, while he emphasized that the chain would closely cooperate with other growers. The opening of the chain was announced for 2016 with locations starting in Alaska, Colorado and Washington, with an expansion planned as marijuana becomes legal in other states.

In August 2019, Willie's Reserve partnered with Nathaniel Rateliff & The Night Sweats to produce a limited line of cannabis cartridges titled "Nightstache Collection".

== See also ==
- List of celebrities who own cannabis businesses
- Leafs By Snoop
- Marley Natural
