= Weed Wars =

- Genre: Documentary
- Country of origin: United States
- No. of seasons: 1
- No. of episodes: 4

Production
- Executive producers: Cameo Wallace; Chuck Braverman
- Running time: 42 minutes (excluding commercials)
- Production company: Braverman Productions

Original release
- Network: Discovery Channel
- Release: December 1 – December 22, 2011

Weed Wars is an American reality-documentary television series that documents a popular medical marijuana dispensary, Harborside Health Center, in Oakland, California. The series premiered on the Discovery Channel on December 1, 2011. The series has since been cancelled.

In regards to their intentions by allowing their business to be documented for television, Steve DeAngelo has said, "We wanted to be a model to other dispensaries, most of [which] have a media phobia. We wanted to tell our story and we gave Discovery complete access so that people could make up their own minds... There are a lot of stereotypes about who comes to these dispensaries, but viewers will see our customers cover a huge cross-section of the population – age, race and economic classes. They will also see how Harborside treats cannabis as a medicine, and we have a high standard of medical care."

== Premise ==
The series is mainly focused on the employees of the marijuana dispensary and the day-to-day aspects of running the business. It also chronicles the various customers to the store, as well as both large-scale growers and smaller, patient cannabis growers who are allowed to grow a limited number of plants.

== Episodes ==
No.	Title	Original release date	U.S. viewers (millions)
1	"World's Largest Medical Marijuana Dispensary"	December 1, 2011	1.359
2	"Federal Crackdown"	December 8, 2011	0.979
3	"Harborside's Employee Betrayal"	December 15, 2011	1.044
4	"Harborside's Alternative 4/20 Celebration"	December 22, 2011	1.328
