= VIVO Cannabis =

Canadian licensed cannabis producer

VIVO Cannabis Inc.
- Formerly: ABcann Global
- Industry: Cannabis
- Headquarters: Napanee, Ontario, Canada
- Parent: MediPharm Labs Corp.
- Subsidiaries: Canna Farms, Harvest Medicine
- Website: vivocannabis.com

VIVO Cannabis Inc (formerly ABcann Global) is a Canadian licensed cannabis producer, headquartered in Napanee, Ontario. Prior to being acquired by MediPharm Labs Corp., VIVO traded on the Toronto Stock Exchange as VIVO.

== History ==
VIVO received two of the first 15 licences by Health Canada in 2014. It became a publicly traded company in April 2017 on the TSX Venture Exchange. In August 2017, the company received a $15 million investment by Cannabis Wheaton to fund the second production facility at its 65-acre property in Napanee. Effective January 24, 2020, the company's stocks were moved from the TSX Venture Exchange to the Toronto Stock Exchange. In April 2023, VIVO merged with TSX-listed MediPharm Labs Corp. (TSX: LABS) in an all-stock deal that resulted in VIVO becoming a subsidiary of MediPharm.

== Operations ==
The company has three cannabis brands: Beacon Medical, Fireside and Lumina. The products are grown using seeds from the Netherlands, and a computerized process where each plant is controlled and monitored. The company has a comprehensive research partnership with the University of Guelph to enhance cannabis production and uses.

In February 2018, VIVO acquired Harvest Medicine Inc, a medical cannabis clinic with 9,700 patients. In August 2018, they acquired Canna Farms, a licensed producer located in Hope, British Columbia.

VIVO works with the Ontario Cannabis Store and the Alberta Gaming, Liquor, and Cannabis Commission as a supplier of recreational marijuana to Ontario and Alberta. Canna Farms, a VIVO subsidiary, is a supplier of recreational marijuana to British Columbia through the B.C. Liquor Distribution Branch.
