= Heaven's Stairway =

Canadian cannabis seedbank

- Industry: Seed bank
- Founded: 1998; 28 years ago
- Defunct: January 31, 2006
- Fate: Raided by the Royal Canadian Mounted Police
- Headquarters: Montreal, Quebec, Canada
- Products: Cannabis
- Owner: Richard Hratch Baghdadlian (a.k.a. Richard Calrisian)

Heaven's Stairway was an Eastern Canadian cannabis seedbank, supplying around 300 different cannabis strains. Established in 1998, the Montreal-based company imported seeds from New Zealand and the Netherlands and shipped them worldwide, especially to customers in Canada, the United States and Europe. On or around January 31, 2006, the company was raided and their websites were taken down. A two-year investigation by the Royal Canadian Mounted Police's Project Courriel seized 200,000 cannabis seeds, US $183,000 and three gold bricks. The company's owner Richard Hratch Baghdadlian, 38, a.k.a. Richard Calrisian, from Marsan Street in Montreal, and six other persons who operated the Heaven’s Stairway company have been charged with importing and trafficking in cannabis.

The cybercompany Heaven’s Stairway used the Internet sites hempqc.com, cannabisworld.com, overgrow.com, eurohemp.com, cannabisseeds.com, and cannabisbay.com. These sites were used to order cannabis seeds online and obtain information on cannabis cultivation. Topics included cannabis growing, cultivation articles, cannabis seeds, pictures and FAQs.

Overgrow.com, the largest cannabis grow site in the world at the time of its demise, was acquired by Baghdadlian in 2002. Overgrow.com was founded in 1999 and fought for the legalization of cannabis by teaching people how to grow their own marijuana. The site was equipped with a unique feature known as the "StrainGuide", which allowed users to search for their favorite type of cannabis by genetic lineage. Having been featured in Maxim and High Times magazines, their forums were popular places for members to chat and socialize, and at its peak had 6,016,336 posts from more than 133,700 registered members.

The DEA and the UN's International Narcotics Control Board held an active interest in the prosecution of Canadian seedbanks. The INCB in its report for the year 1999 said: "The Board notes with concern the indoor cultivation of very potent cannabis varieties is being promoted through the sale of both cannabis seeds and paraphernalia for growing cannabis over the internet through websites located primarily on servers in Canada. There is an urgent need for action required to counter the spread of such cultivation." (Report of the INCB for 1999, chapter III, paragraph 271, Feb. 2000)

== See also ==
- Cannabis in Canada
