= List of celebrities who own cannabis businesses =

The trend of celebrities owning cannabis businesses is a recent phenomenon, sparked by the decriminalization of non-medical cannabis in the United States.

== List of celebrities ==
Below is a partial listing of celebrities who own commercial cannabis farms or other cannabis-related brands or businesses.

Celebrity	Business	Notes	Ref.
Jim Belushi	Belushi's Farm	American Actor Jim Belushi grows and farms his own weed. One of his signature brands is named Blues Brothers, in reference to his brother's famous movie role.	
Tommy Chong	Chong's Choice		
Ice Cube	Fryday Kush		
Snoop Dogg	G-Pen	Rapper Snoop Dogg released the electrical weed vaporizer G-Pen in a collaboration with Grenco Science in 2013.	
Snoop Dogg	Leafs By Snoop	A cannabis brand launched in 2015 owned and promoted by the rapper Snoop Dogg and produced by Canopy Growth Corporation.	
Snoop Dogg	Merry Jane	A cannabis-focused digital media platform launched by rapper Snoop Dogg in 2015, together with media entrepreneur Ted Chung.	
Creagen Dow	Poke A Bowl	The Big Bang Theory and Zoey 101 actor Creagen Dow owns a company that sells ashtrays that remove both ash and resin, designed by himself.	
Drake	Bullrider	Drake also had partnership with Canopy Growth before.	
Melissa Etheridge	Etheridge Botanicals	Melissa Etheridge co-founded Etheridge Botanicals in 2021 to advocate and represent "wellness as a human right."	
The Game	Trees by Game	Rapper The Game started his own cannabis company called Trees By Game after purchasing a cannabis dispensary called The Reserve in Santa Ana, California.	
Jason Gann	Wilfred	Jason Gann launched Wilfred Cannabis in 2020.	
Whoopi Goldberg	Whoopi & Maya	Actress Whoopi Goldberg started selling medical marijuana in 2016. The company shut down in 2020.	
Rob Gronkowski	CBDMEDIC	Former NFL player Rob Gronkowski became a spokesperson for CBDMEDIC in 2019.	
Woody Harrelson	The Woods	Woody Harrelson opened The Woods dispensary in West Hollywood in 2022.	
Al Harrington	Viola Brands	NBA star Al Harrington was ahead of the curve with legal weed, founding Viola in 2011.	
Mickey Hart	Mind Your Head	Grateful Dead drummer Mickey Hart started selling pre-rolls in 2019.	
Jay-Z	Caliva	Rapper Jay-Z entered a partnership with California-based cannabis company Caliva in 2019.	
Kourtney Kardashian	Hora x Poosh	Reality star Kourtney Kardashian started selling CBD-based face serum as an anti-aging solution in 2019.	
Wiz Khalifa	Khalifa Kush	Khalifa launched Khalifa Kush in 2014.	
John Legend	Plus Products Inc.	Singer John Legend started investing in a company that produces CBD products such as edible gummies in 2019.	
Method Man	Tical	Method Man launched Tical to support black business.	
Cheech Marin	Cheech's Stash	Marin got into the cannabis industry in 2018 with Cheech's Stash, introducing both marijuana and CBD products.	
Shavo Odadjian	22Red	In 2016, the bass player launched his licensed marijuana operation, 22Red.	
Gwyneth Paltrow	Cann	Actress Gwyneth Paltrow's company Goop started investing in Cann, a cannabis-infused beverage maker, in 2020.	
B-Real	Dr. Green thumb's	Dr. Greenthumb's is a cannabis retailer owned and founded by Cypress Hill rapper B-Real. The original location opened in August 2018 in Sylmar, California.	
Carlos Santana	Mirayo	Carlos Santana joined the Cannabis industry in 2020, heavily linking his Mirayo by Santana brand to spirituality practices.	
Martha Stewart	Martha Stewart CBD	Stewart released her line of CBD-products in collaboration with Canopy Growth Corporation and Marquee Brands in 2020.	
Bella Thorne	Forbidden Flowers	Actress Bella Thorne launched her consumer cannabis and CBD brand in 2019.	
Mike Tyson	Tyson Ranch	Heavyweight boxing champion Mike Tyson opened his 400-acre cannabis resort 2019.	
David Crosby	Mighty Croz	David Crosby announces 'MIGHTY CROZ' Cannabis Is Coming!	
Willie Nelson	Willie's Reserve	Willie Nelson endorses his own brand of Cannabis-based products sold in Colorado and Arizona.	
Seth Rogen	Houseplant	Seth co-founded the company with Canadian screenwriter Evan Goldberg in 2021.	
Lil Wayne	GKUA	In December 2019, Carter announced his own cannabis brand under the name of GKUA Ultra Premium.	
Jaleel White	itsPurpl	Jaleel White launched the brand in collaboration with 710 Labs in 2021.	
Ricky Williams	Highsman	Ricky Williams launched his sports-themed weed brand, Highsman, in late 2021.	

== See also ==
- Cannabis culture
- Cannabis industry
- Decriminalization of non-medical cannabis in the United States
