= Have a Heart Compassion Care =

Recreational cannabis dispensary chain

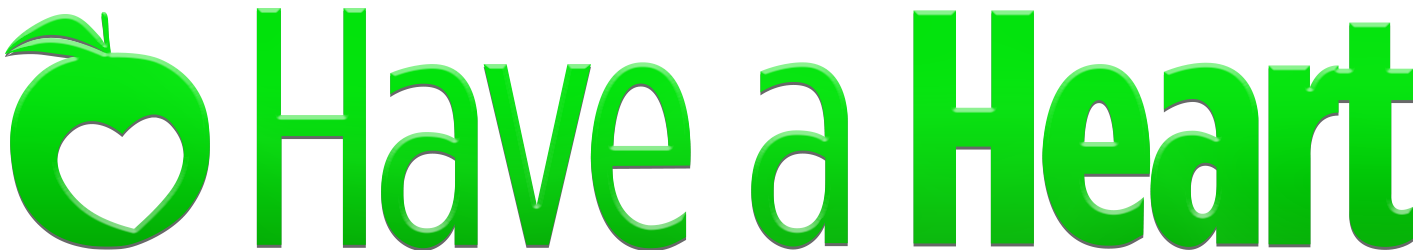
- Company type: Private
- Industry: Cannabis
- Founder: Ryan Kunkel
- Headquarters: Seattle, WA, United States
- Area served: Washington
- Website: https://haveaheartcc.com/

Have a Heart Compassion Care is a cannabis dispensary chain in Washington state.

== History ==
Have a Heart Compassion Care was founded by Ryan Kunkel in 2011.

There are currently six Have a Heart dispensaries in the state of Washington.

On August 24, 2018, Have a Heart and the United Food and Commercial Workers International Union Local 21 signed Washington state's first collective bargaining agreement between an adult-use cannabis dispensary and a union.

On March 16, 2020 Harvest Health and Recreation announced its acquisition of Have a Heart for 85.8 million dollars.
