= Cannabis City =

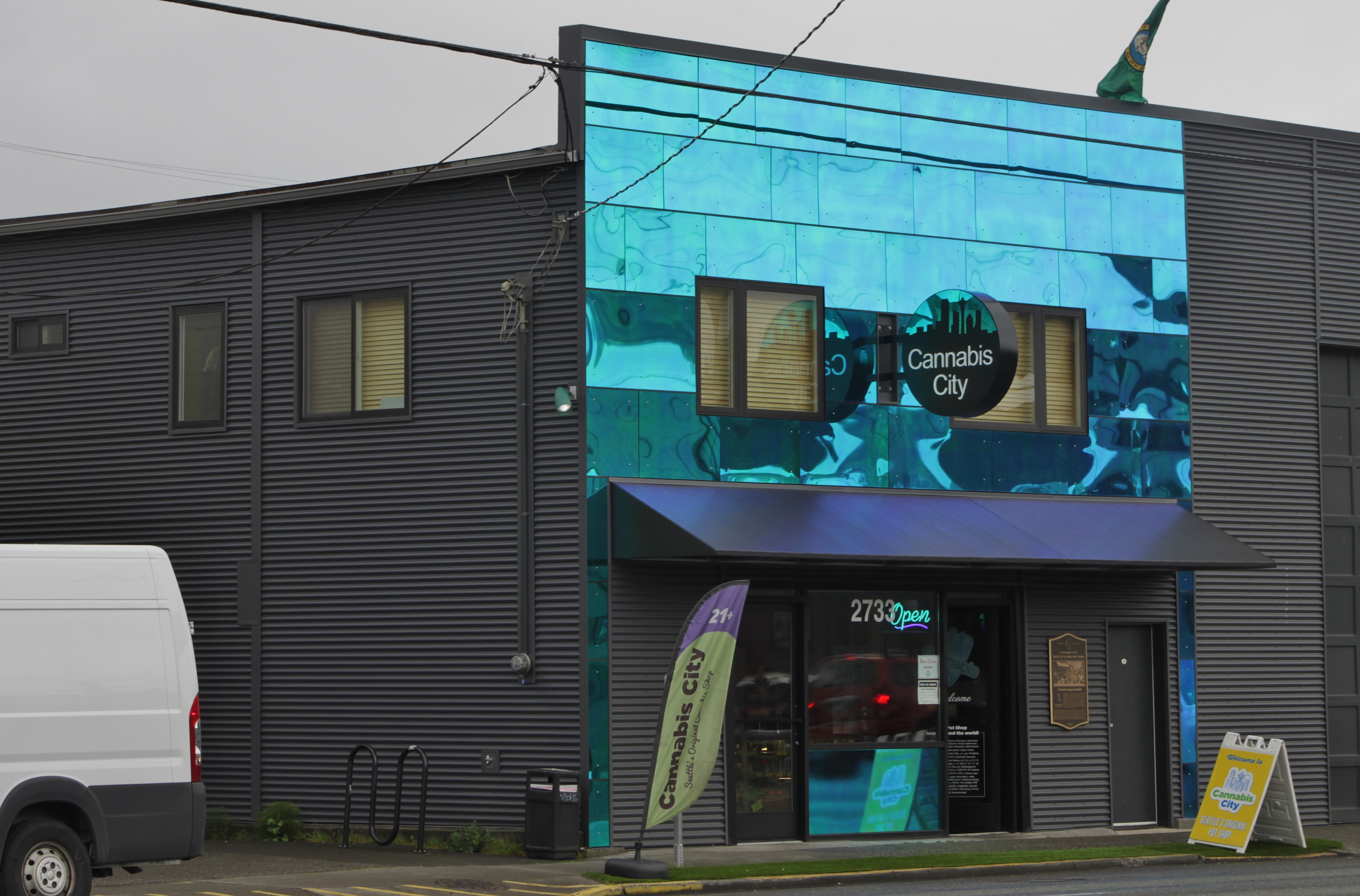
- Cannabis City in May 2017
- Location: Seattle
- Coordinates: 47°34′43.6″N 122°19′45.6″W
- Opened: July 8, 2014
- Owner: James Lathrop

Cannabis City is an American recreational marijuana retail store located in Seattle, Washington. The store, located in the SoDo neighborhood south of downtown, opened on July 8, 2014, and was the first of its kind in that city. The store is owned by James Lathrop, a Doctor of Nursing Practice, and a U.S. Desert Storm war veteran. In July, the store was asked to submit historical paraphernalia to Seattle's Museum of History and Industry for preservation.
