= Aurora Cannabis =

Canadian cannabis company

Aurora Cannabis, Inc.
- Type: Public
- Traded as: TSX: ACB; Nasdaq: ACB
- Industry: Cannabis
- Founded: 2006
- Founders: Terry Booth, Steve Dobler, Chris Mayerson, Dale Lesack
- Headquarters: Edmonton, Canada
- Area served: Canada, Europe, Australia
- Key people: Miguel Martin (CEO)
- Revenue: ▼ Can$176 million (March 2023)
- Operating income: ▲ Can$ -158 million (2023)
- Net income: ▲ Can$ -208 million (2023)
- Total assets: ▼ Can$484 million (2023)
- Total equity: ▼ Can$491 million (2023)
- Number of employees: 1130
- Subsidiaries: Pedanios GmbH, Urban Cultivator, Australis Capital Inc., CanvasRx Inc., H2 Biopharma Inc., Peloton Pharmaceuticals Inc., Aurora Larssen Projects Ltd., Larssen Ltd., Aurora Cannabis Enterprises Inc., BC Northern Lights Enterprises Ltd., Medreleaf (Australia)
- Website: www.auroramj.com

Aurora Cannabis Inc. is a Canadian licensed cannabis producer, headquartered in Edmonton. It trades on the Toronto Stock Exchange and Nasdaq as ACB. As of September 2018, Aurora Cannabis had eight licensed production facilities, five sales licences, and operations in 25 countries. It had a funded capacity of over 625,000 kilograms of cannabis production per annum with the bulk of capacity based in Canada and a growing presence in international markets, particularly Denmark and Latin America. The company began trading on the NYSE on October 23, 2018, using the ticker ACB.

After significant expansion in 2018, the company reduced expenses in the second half of 2019 when the Canadian recreational cannabis market had low sales due to excessive inventory and uncompetitive pricing with the black market. In February 2020, cofounder and chief executive, Terry Booth, resigned, being replaced by Executive Chairman Michael Singer as interim CEO.

== History ==
Aurora was founded in 2006 by Terry Booth, Steve Dobler, Dale Lesack and Chris Mayerson. Booth and Dobler collectively invested over $5 million of their own capital. The founding group secured a 160+ acre parcel of land in Mountain View County, Alberta, where they established Aurora's first facility. The company received its license to grow cannabis in 2014, making it the first cannabis producer to obtain a federal license in that province. They decided to establish the company in Alberta due to comparatively low corporate tax rates and an ideal farm credit program. On November 27, 2014, Health Canada issued Aurora's first license to sell medical cannabis. Since then they have built, and are operating, numerous growing facilities throughout Canada, Europe, Asia, Latin America and Oceania. On January 10, 2017, Aurora received a license from Health Canada to sell cannabis oils, having been granted a license to produce the oils in February 2016. Sales of four product lines of cannabis oils commenced in April, 2017.

=== After legalization in Canada - October 2018 ===
Canada legalized the retail sale of cannabis nationally on October 17, 2018. Due to its significant capital investments, particularly in large growing facilities, Aurora had about 20% of the Canadian retail market for cannabis during early 2019.

At its year-end in June 2019, Aurora had a market capitalization of US$4.8 billion. An October 2019 report stated that cannabis stocks had "crumbled to their lowest level since 2017"; Aurora shares were also at a two-year low. The fall in stock price for Aurora and other Canadian cannabis stocks in late 2019 was attributed to the missed benchmark revenues, general lack of profitability in the industry, slow rollout of retail stores in Canada, rise in vaping-related illnesses, non-competitiveness of pricing with black market cannabis, oversupply of commercial cannabis, termination of capital expenditures, and an FDA warning that cannabidiol may cause liver injury, among others.

=== Public trading and acquisitions ===
Aurora became a publicly traded company on the Toronto Stock Exchange on July 24, 2017, and on the New York Stock Exchange on October 23, 2018.

Aurora grew through several acquisitions. By 2018, Aurora's subsidiaries included Pedanios GmbH (Germany's largest distributor of cannabis to pharmacies), CanvasRx (the largest medical cannabis patient outreach service in Canada), BC Northern Lights (an indoor growing supplies manufacturer), Aurora-Larssen Projects (a globally leading greenhouse engineering and design consultancy), and H2 Biopharma (a late-stage ACMPR applicant in Quebec)

By April 2018, the company had a market value of Can$4.5 billion; revenue in 2017 totaled Can$31.1 million. At the time, the company was concluding its takeover merger of previous competitor CanniMed Therapeutics. The takeover was finalized in January 2018, based on a Can$1.1 billion deal. The subsequent plan to purchase MedReleaf was expected to make the company the largest in Canada with a market capitalization of approximately $7 billion. Competitor Canopy Growth Corporation's market value exceeded that amount by $3.7 billion, however after a partial takeover by Constellation Brands was announced in late August 2018. By 24 September 2018, however, Tilray Inc., a portfolio company of Seattle-based Privateer Holdings, with growing facilities in Nanaimo, BC, had become the world's second most valuable cannabis company with a market capitalization of about US$10 billion.

A report in mid-September 2018 by BNN Bloomberg, stated that Coca-Cola was considering the development of cannabis-infused beverages for medical purposes (with a non-psychoactive ingredient, CBD) and was in preliminary discussion with Aurora. Although Coke and Aurora then announced that they were merely studying the market, and had no plan to announce regarding the distribution of such products. Aurora's shares increased and its market cap reached US$10.71 billion on September 18, 2018. On 20 September 2018, Tilray had become the world's most valuable cannabis company, but a major drop in share price (and a subsequent market capitalization of about US$10 billion) made it only the third largest, after Canopy Growth and Aurora.

In September 2020, Aurora Cannabis reportedly lost more than Can$3.3 billion in its recently concluded fiscal year which caused shares to drop roughly 10% in after-hours trading. A major issue has been Aurora's focus on premium cannabis as it is more expensive for consumers.

In May 2021, Aurora moved its U.S. listing from the NYSE to the Nasdaq.

=== Class action lawsuits in the United States ===
During the fourth quarter of 2019, several law firms in the United States announced class action lawsuits against Aurora, citing the abrupt decline in stock price, failure to complete planned capital investments, and missed revenue and profit forecasts by the company as misleading to public investors.

=== Status at end of 2019 ===
During an interview in November 2019, CEO Terry Booth discussed the poor retail performance of the Canadian cannabis industry, saying that "carnage" was possible unless certain producers were able to reduce the cost of operations when oversupply existed. In December, two of Aurora's senior executives departed the company: Chief Global Business Development Officer, Neil Belot, and Chief Corporate Officer, Cam Battley, when the price of the company's stock had dropped 61% over 2019. During the fourth quarter of 2019, the company had suspended cannabis production in Denmark and at its greenhouses in Medicine Hat, Alberta. The company's 15,000-square-foot (1,400 m^{2}), non-operational, greenhouse in Exeter, Ontario was also listed for sale. This was part of the goal to "reduce its expenses and boost its cash balance after a series of weak quarters," according to a news report. The company's second quarter report (for the period ending 31 December 2019) indicated a loss of US$981 million.

Aurora claimed it had reduced the cost of producing cannabis to $0.85 per gram, when the national retail price of cannabis in Canada was $7.37 per gram. In December, Aurora announced its release of products for "Cannabis 2.0" – the retail market for edible cannabis products – to include gummies, chocolates, baked goods, and mints.

== Acquisitions and growth ==
Aurora owns Pedanios GmbH, a wholesale importer, exporter, and distributor of medical cannabis in the European Union, based in Berlin, Germany. Pedanios is the EU's largest distributor of cannabis by volume of product sold. As of March 2018, it is one of three distributors to offer cannabis flowers sourced from both Canada and the Netherlands.

In January, 2018, Aurora became the first private company to be granted a supply agreement to the Italian market through its German subsidiary Pedanios. Aurora announced on January 23, 2018, that the first tender would consist of three lots of different cannabinoid profiles totalling 100 kilograms (220 lb).

A statement from the company in early October 2019 reported a funding capacity for over 625,000 kilograms (1,378,000 lb) of cannabis per year, with sales and operations in 25 countries. Weeks later however, the company was reported to be having cash flow problems and the value of its stock had dropped significantly.

=== CanniMed takeover ===
On November 13, 2017, Aurora Cannabis delivered an all-stock takeover bid to CanniMed Therapeutics's board of directors, which became public on November 14. It claimed that it had the support of 38% of shareholders. CanniMed management responded by rejecting the offer, and proposed an alternative merger with Newstrike Resources, a recreational cannabis firm, instead. CanniMed also enacted a "poison pill" to fend off the acquisition by enacting a rights plan that would allow CanniMed shareholders to vote on the Newstrike deal. On November 20, Aurora launched a hostile takeover bid for CanniMed, conditional on shareholders rejecting the Newstrike deal.

The Ontario Securities Commission intervened in this, the first major hostile takeover bid in Canada's cannabis industry, ordering Aurora Cannabis Inc. to provide more disclosure regarding any ties to individuals "in a special relationship" with target CanniMed Therapeutics Inc. and blocking CanniMed from adopting the so-called "poison pill" defence. The ties were deemed unfounded by the Securities Commission. On January 17, 2018, Newstrike shareholders approved the proposed merger. On January 18, CanniMed postponed its shareholder vote on the Newstrike deal, submitting that it will hold talks with suitor Aurora Cannabis. On January 24, it was announced that Aurora Cannabis finally hammered out a deal to acquire CanniMed Therapeutics Inc. for $1.1 billion, and CanniMed dropped its plans to acquire Newstrike.

In March 2018, Aurora completed their acquisition of Cannimed, with both parties agreeing to the transaction on friendly terms. This agreement brought Aurora's total patient count to 42,000 registered cannabis patients in Canada.

=== MedReleaf merger ===
In mid-May 2018, the company announced a merger with MedReleaf in a $3.2 billion stock deal already approved by the directors of both companies. The transaction closed in July, with MedReleaf shareholders receiving 3.575 Aurora shares for each MedReleaf share they owned. After the merger closed, the combined company's production capacity stood at 570,000 kilograms of cannabis at its nine grow operations in Canada and two in Denmark, if it uses all of the available capacity. The value of the new company could be as high as $7 billion, made it larger than Canopy Growth Corporation with its market cap of $6.45 billion in 2018. It would have distribution agreements in a number of countries, including Germany, Italy, Brazil and Australia.

MedReleaf's German partner filed damage claims against Aurora and MedReleaf in October 2018 for breaching an exclusive supply agreement. Cannamedical had sponsored MedReleaf's Markham EU GMP certification and played a decisive role in the successful completion.

In 2020, Aurora sold the former MedReleaf facility located in Exeter, Ontario.

== Growing facilities ==
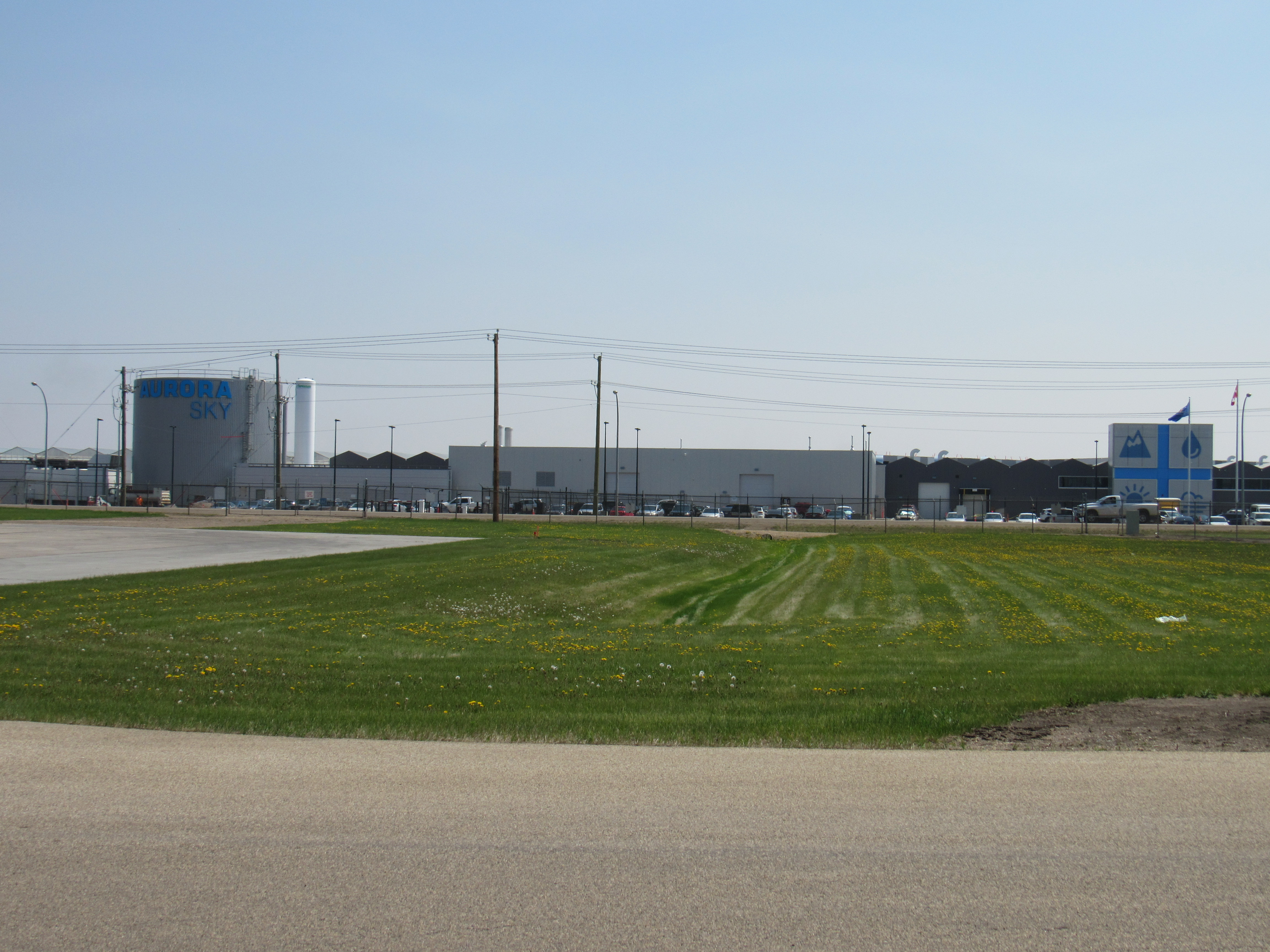
Aurora Cannabis greenhouse and Headquarters at Edmonton International Airport

Aurora Mountain was Aurora's first facility, completed in 2015. It is a 55,200-square-foot (5,130 m^{2}) production facility in Mountain View County.

Aurora Vie is a 40,000-square-foot (3,700 m^{2}), fully licensed, indoor production facility in Pointe-Claire, Quebec. It was the second licensed producer in Quebec, and was acquired in 2017 for $7 million when it was about 80% complete.

In 2017, Aurora Cannabis began construction of Aurora Sky, an automated 800,000-square-foot (74,000 m^{2}) plant in Alberta that it said would be capable of producing 100,000 kilograms of cannabis annually. The land is part of the acreage owned by the Edmonton International Airport.

Construction on the Nordic 2 project in Denmark was stopped in November 2019 when the company's stock dropped to a two-year low. The Aurora Sun project in Alberta was put on a temporary hold. These decisions would lead to a savings of $190 million.

In 2021, Aurora shuttered its Aurora Polaris facility in Edmonton; it was sold in 2023. Aurora Sky was sold to Bevo Agtech in 2022, following a transaction in which Aurora took a 50.1 per cent stake in that company.

== Testing ==
Aurora states that all products are tested by a third-party laboratory and results are displayed on the company's website and mobile app. In March 2017, Aurora's online store and mobile app began providing public access to a simplified version of every Certificate of Analysis (CoA) for every cannabis product available.

== Retail ==
As of April 2019, Aurora had about 17 retail outlets in western Canada through its strategic partnership with Choom Holdings Inc. and acquisition of Clarity Cannabis Retail Stores, with 52 more store locations in development. In November 2019, Aurora opened an 11,000 square foot (1,022 square meters) flagship retail store in West Edmonton Mall, making the store the largest cannabis retail space in Canada. Aurora acquired a stake in Alcanna Inc. (parent company of Nova Cannabis retail stores) in 2018, at one point owning 25% of the company. These shares were completely divested in June 2020.
