= Anheuser-Busch brands =

Brewing company

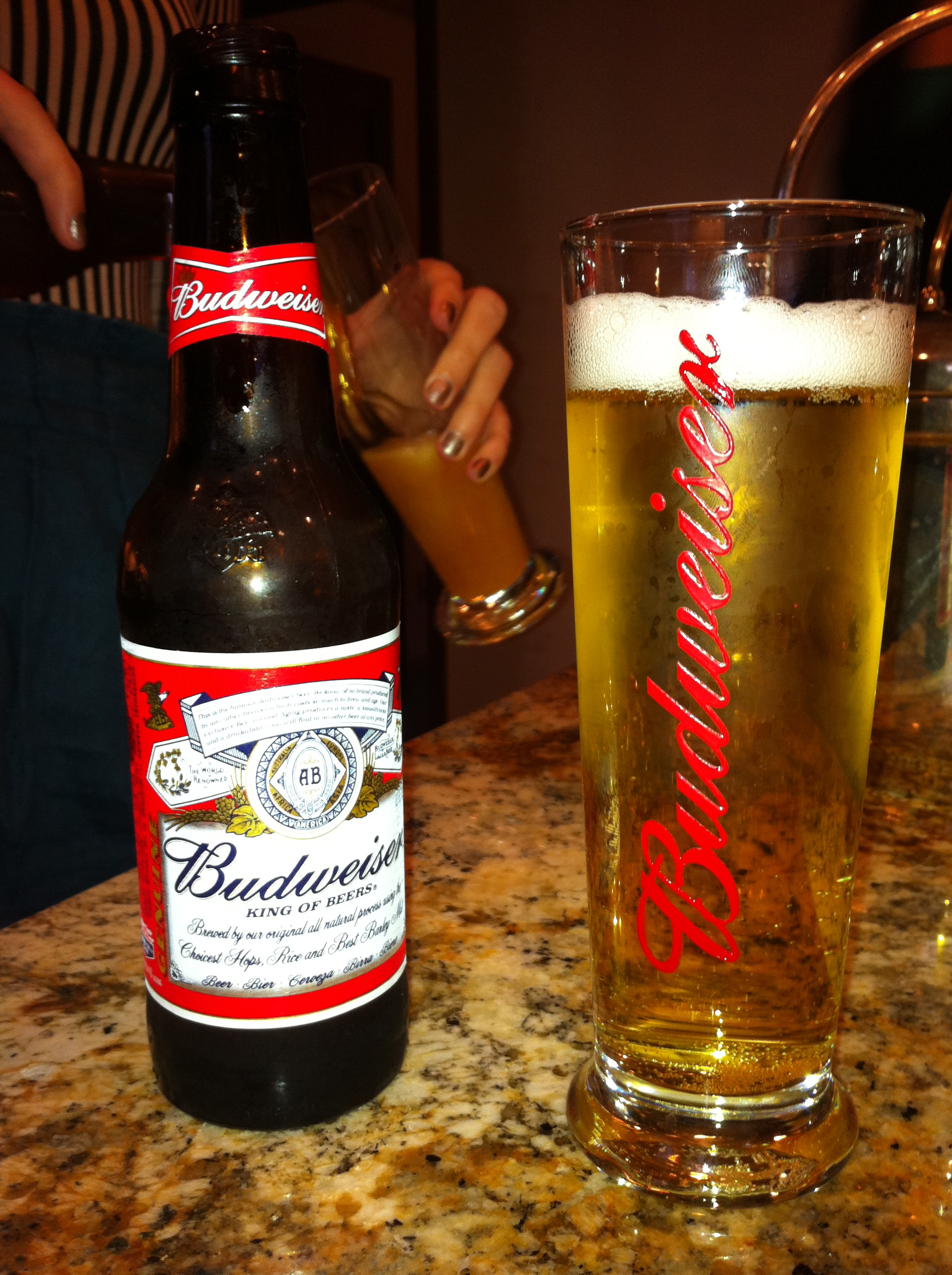
Budweiser beer

Anheuser-Busch is the largest brewing company in the United States, with a market share of 34% percent in 2023. A wholly owned subsidiary of Anheuser-Busch InBev SA/NV, Anheuser-Busch operates 12 breweries in the United States and nearly 20 in other countries, which increased after Anheuser-Busch InBev SA/NV acquired SABMiller in 2016. Brands include Budweiser, Busch, Michelob, Bud Light, and Natural Light. As of September 2025, Michelob Ultra is the top-selling beer in America.

== Budweiser ==
=== Budweiser ===
Budweiser is a 5.0% ABV Adjunct pale lager introduced in 1876 by Adolphus Busch and long one of the best selling beers in the United States. It is made with up to 30% rice in addition to hops and barley malt. Budweiser is produced in breweries around the United States and the world. It is a filtered beer available in draught and packaged forms. Lower strength versions are distributed in regions with restrictive alcohol laws.

=== Budweiser Select ===
Budweiser Select, or Bud Select, is a light pale lager that contains 4.3% ABV and 99 calories per 12 US fl oz serving (1,170 kJ/L). Anheuser-Busch has aggressively promoted Budweiser Select. Its slogan was "The Real Deal". The company hired Jay-Z as a spokesman for the brand.

==== Budweiser Select 55 ====
A version of Budweiser Select that contains 55 calories per 12 US fl oz serving (650 kJ/L) is "a direct counterstrike to Miller's MGD 64" according to Anheuser-Busch officials. Budweiser currently claims that it is the lightest beer in the world. The food energy in both Miller's MGD 64 and Budweiser's Select 55 have been reduced simply by lowering the fermentables content. MGD 64 has only 2.8% alcohol content and some Select 55 states "alcohol content not more than 3.2% by weight / 4% by volume", possibly to allow its sale in areas where that is the limit. The actual alcohol content of "55" is reported to be 2.4% ABV; by comparison, most American lagers have around 5%.

=== Budweiser 66 ===
Budweiser Brew No. 66 is a 4% alcohol by volume lager that is brewed and distributed in the United Kingdom by InBev UK Limited. Launched in July 2010, Budweiser 66 contains 84 Calories per 300 mL serving.

=== Budweiser 1933 Repeal Reserve ===
A 6.1% ABV amber lager style introduced in November 2017, inspired by a pre-prohibition recipe.

=== Budweiser Zero ===
Shortly after Prohibition Brew's discontinuation, InBev announced a new non-alcohol beer drink called Budweiser Zero. NBA player Dwyane Wade partnered with the company in the creation of the drink, stating "it was personal to me because of my mom's and dad's journey through addiction" and called the drink "a can that gives you that encouragement" while attempting to avoid alcohol. In May 2022, InBev announced that they were falling short of their previously stated goal of 20% of their beverage volume being alcohol free, having reached 6% saturation at the time.

The drink features zero sugar, zero alcohol, zero carbs, and fifty calories. Various promotions tied to the product have been offered, such as free Uber rides. It has been received with mixed reviews. InBev has received negative press from critics with complaints such as "who drinks Budweiser for the taste", and The Week calling it "an attack on American values". It has mixed to positive reviews among taste testers, being praised to its beer-like appearance and taste, and slightly criticized for being bland in flavor.

=== Bud Light ===
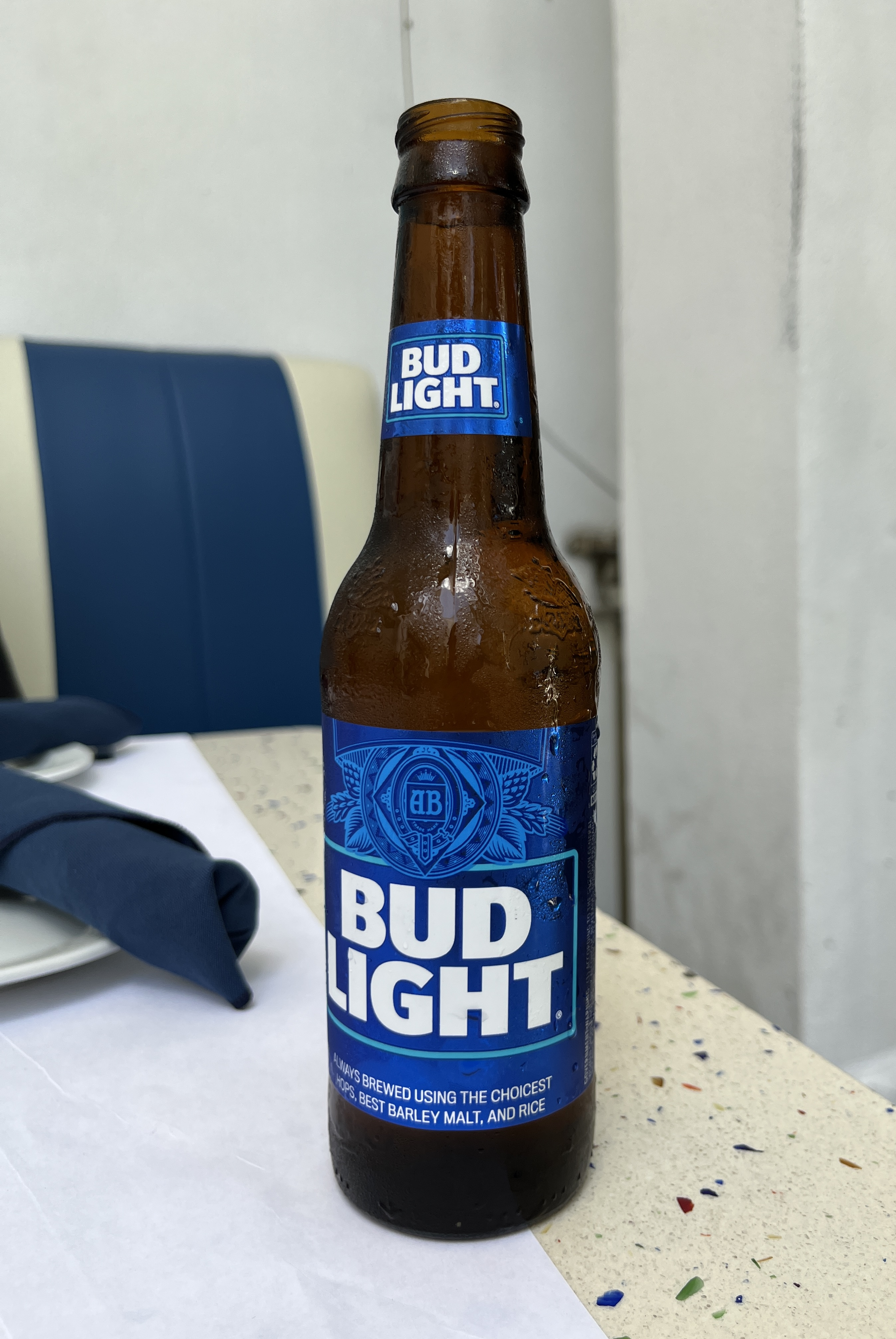
A bottle of Bud Light

Introduced in 1982 as Budweiser Light, it is Budweiser's flagship low-calorie lager beverage, advertised as a light beer with 4.2% ABV and 110 calories per 12 US fl oz (355 mL) serving (1,300 kJ/L).

Launching at Super Bowl XIX in 1985, the "Gimme a Light" ad campaign propelled, by 1994, the brand beyond Miller Lite, the original category definer.

From 1987 to 1989, Spuds MacKenzie, a Bull Terrier was used as a mascot in the Bud Light commercials.

From 1993 to 1998, Bud Light aired 30-second commercials featuring Rob and Laura from the CBS series The Dick Van Dyke Show. The Bud Light King and Queen along with the Bud Knight characters were later created for commercials.

==== 2023 boycott ====
On April 1, 2023, Bud Light sent transgender social media personality Dylan Mulvaney custom Bud Light cans featuring Mulvaney's face to celebrate the anniversary of Mulvaney's "365 Days of Girlhood" series, which documented Mulvaney's gender transition. In response, several notable figures on the American right called for a boycott of the company.

On April 14, 2023, Anheuser-Busch CEO Brendan Whitworth released a statement saying, "We never intended to be part of a discussion that divides people." Whitworth's statement was characterized by The Washington Post as a "vaguely apologetic statement [that] satisfied seemingly no one." On April 20, 2023, White House Press Secretary Karine Jean-Pierre spoke out against the rhetoric of "violence and vitriol" against transgender Americans by those boycotting the beverage. In late April, a spokesperson for Anheuser-Busch said that two executives – Bud Light's vice president of marketing and her boss – would take leaves of absence.

In the month following the advertisement, Bud Light sales dropped 13.7 percent. During a May 4, 2023, conference call with investors, Anheuser-Busch InBev's CEO Michel Doukeris said the drop in Bud Light sales "would represent around 1% of our overall global volumes for that period". Doukeris also said that the company would triple Bud Light's advertising budget in the upcoming months in an attempt to recover billions of dollars of lost sales.

In June 2023, Bud Light announced that as promotion for the 2023 Fourth of July weekend, they would be offering $15 coupons on purchasing 15-pack Bud Lights, which means the beer would be free via some stores that sell it at a discount lower than $15.

=== Bud Light Platinum ===
A slightly sweeter, higher alcohol version of Bud Light launched in early 2012, with 6% ABV. This product is noted for being packaged in a new translucent blue glass bottle. Bud Light Platinum has 139 calories per 12 US fl oz serving (1,640 kJ/L), 8 fewer than a regular Budweiser.

=== Bud Light Apple ===
Bud Light with apple flavor added. It has 151 calories per 12 US fl oz serving (1,780 kJ/L). Released in 2015 with 4.2% ABV.

=== Bud Light Peels ===
These beers make up the Bud Light citrus portfolio.

==== Bud Light Lemonade ====
Bud Light made with real lemonade. It has 149 calories per 12 US fl oz serving (1,760 kJ/L). Released in May 2020 with 4.2% alcohol content, the same alcohol content as Bud Light.

==== Bud Light Lime ====
Bud Light with lime flavor added. It has 116 calories per 12 US fl oz serving (1,370 kJ/L). Released in May 2008 with 4.2% alcohol content, the same alcohol content as Bud Light.

==== Bud Light Orange ====
Bud Light made with orange peels. It has 142 calories per 12 US fl oz serving (1,670 kJ/L). Released in April 2018 with 4.2% alcohol content, the same alcohol content as Bud Light.

=== Bud Light Seltzer ===
Bud Light released their own alcoholic seltzer water beverage in mid-January 2020. The four flavors available include black cherry, watermelon, tangerine, mango, and are made from cane sugar and fruit flavor. Each can has 100 calories per 12 US fl oz serving and has 5% ABV.

=== Bud Light Lime-A-Ritas ===
Since April 2012, AB has released a line of 8% alcohol by volume (6% ABV in Canada) flavored malt beverages titled "Bud Light Lime Ritas", with its flagship flavor being the "Lime-a-Rita", a lime flavored beverage. The drinks are available in a twenty-five ounce can, as well as a twelve-pack of eight ounce cans. Since then, AB has released the strawberry-flavored "Straw-Ber-Rita", the mango flavored "Mang-o-Rita", and the raspberry flavored "Raz-Ber-Rita". For the winter 2013 season, AB released the cranberry-flavored "Cran-Brrr-Rita" as well, and wound up extending it through January and February 2014 due to strong sales. After the release of the "Mang-o-Rita" and "Raz-Ber-Rita", A-B released an eighteen-pack case containing six "Lime-a-Ritas", four "Straw-Ber-Ritas", four "Mang-o-Ritas", and four "Raz-Ber-Ritas".

In August 2014, A-B released a new fall seasonal extension for their "Rita" line, "Apple-Ahh-Rita", an apple-flavored margarita sold until November 2014.

In February 2015, A-B released a new summer seasonal extension for their "Rita" line, "Lemon-Ade-Rita", a lemonade flavored margarita.

In summer 2016, A-B released the newest "rita" flavor of their line named "Water-melon-rita", a watermelon flavored margarita. A-B also released the "Grape-Ahh-Rita", a grape flavored margarita. In fall 2016, A-B released the new "Cherry-Ahh-Rita", a cherry-flavored margarita.

In summer 2017, A-B released the new "Peach-A-Rita". A-B also released the new "Orange-A-Rita", in certain states and the "Grape-Ahh-Rita" was renamed "Grape-A-Rita". Also in summer 2017, A-B introduced "Splash by Lime-A-Rita", a line of lighter Lime-A-Ritas with less alcohol, calories, and carbs available in three flavors; the existing "Straw-Ber-Rita" and the two new flavors "Pine-Apple-Rita" and "Coco-Nut-Rita". In the fall of 2017, A-B introduced Pome-Granate-Rita.

In 2018, A-B introduced several flavors, including, Pine-Apple-Rita, Coco-Nut-Rita, Grape-Fruit-Rita, Berry-A-Rita, and brought back the watermelon flavor.

In 2019, Passion-Fruit-Rita and Cherry-Lime-Rita were introduced and cranberry came back. In 2020, A-B introduced Guav-A-Rita.

=== Bud Ice ===
Introduced in October 1993 as Ice by Budweiser, Bud Ice is an ice beer which has more alcohol (5.5% ABV) than Budweiser. It is best known for an advertising campaign that involved a malevolent penguin that stalked Bud Ice drinkers and stole their beer, announcing its presence by singing the "doo-be-doo-be-doo" phrase from "Strangers in the Night".

=== Bud Extra ===
A beer with caffeine, ginseng, guarana and alcohol. It contains 6.6% ABV. It was marketed as a caffeinated malt beverage, similar to Sparks. On June 26, 2008, Anheuser-Busch announced that it would remove caffeine and guarana from the beverage in response to concerns that the product was being marketed to consumers under the age of 21.

=== Budweiser/Bud Light Chelada ===
A blend of Budweiser or Bud Light and Clamato. This beverage became available nationally in late 2007.

=== Discontinued ===
==== Budweiser American Ale ====
Budweiser American Ale debuted in 2008. The beer was claimed to offer complex taste without much bitterness. American Ale had a distinctive hoppier flavor than other Anheuser-Busch beers, in an attempt to capture some of the American craft beer market, although most American craft beers are hoppier. American Ale was the first beer under the Budweiser name that was brewed with a top fermenting yeast. The beer's darker color was a departure from the other Budweiser brands. Production was discontinued by 2011.

==== Budweiser Brew Masters' Private Reserve ====
Budweiser Brew Masters' Private Reserve is an all-malt lager with a honey color and robust taste. It is based on a "Budweiser brewmaster holiday tradition of collecting the richest part of the batch which is tapped to the brew kettles to toast the holiday season."

==== Budweiser Malt Liquor ====
Introduced in limited test markets between 1970 and 1973, its slogan was "The first malt liquor good enough to bear the name."

==== Budweiser Prohibition Brew ====
In 2015, AB InBev committed to ensuring that low-alcohol and nonalcoholic beers would represent at least 20% of its global beer volume by 2025. They followed the announcement by launching their Prohibition Brew-branded non-alcoholic drink and introduced it to the Canadian market in 2016. It was brewed in the same method as Budweiser, with the alcohol removed via evaporation. It was discontinued in 2020, in favor of a new non-alcoholic beer brand, Budweiser Zero, which features a different recipe and a partnership with professional NBA player Dwyane Wade.

==== Bud Dry ====
Bud Dry was introduced nationally in the U.S. in April 1990 with the slogan of "Why ask why? Try Bud Dry." It was originally successful in test markets and was expected to be a popular beer with the rise in light lager popularity. Dry beer is a form of pale lager where the sugars are more fully fermented to give a less sweet beer. It is also known as the Diät-Pils style. However, after the introduction of Bud Ice in 1994, Bud Dry was not heavily marketed. Production was discontinued in December 2010.

==== Bud Ice Light ====
Bud Ice Light contains 5.0% ABV and 115 calories per 12 US fl oz serving (1,360 kJ/L). It undergoes fractional freezing, which Bud Light does not undergo. It was discontinued in 2010.

==== Bud Light Golden Wheat ====
Bud Light Golden Wheat, a Hefeweizen based on the classic German wheat beer, was introduced on October 5, 2009, in response to the increase such beers produced by American craft brewers. It had 118 calories per 12 US fl oz serving (1,390 kJ/L), 8.3 grams of carbohydrates and 4.1% alcohol by volume. Production was discontinued in 2012.

==== Bud Silver ====
An attempt to appeal to the tastes of beer drinkers in the United Kingdom, this specially brewed beer contained 4.2% alcohol by volume. It was discontinued in 2006 after it failed to meet sales expectations.

==== Red Wolf ====
A red ale marketed during the 1990s in the United States. It was enjoyed by some consumers, but neither as well known nor as popular as other Anheuser-Busch brands. Discontinued c. 2000.

== Michelob ==
Michelob (/ˈmɪk.ə.loʊb/) is a 4.2% ABV pale lager developed by Adolphus Busch in 1896 as a "draught beer for connoisseurs". Michelob is the German name for the market town of Měcholupy, now in the Czech Republic, known for its brewing tradition. As of September 2025, Michelob Ultra, a reduced carbohydrate brew, was the #1 selling beer in the United States, displacing Modelo Especial, which had held the top rank since June 2023 when it overtook Bud Light following backlash against the company over the Dylan Mulvaney promotion.

Michelob began its ascent towards becoming a popular national brand in 1961, when Anheuser-Busch produced a pasteurized version of the beer which allowed its legal shipment across state lines. Bottled beer began to be shipped soon after, and the brand was introduced in cans in 1966. Bottled Michelob was originally sold in a uniquely shaped bottle named the teardrop bottle because it resembled a water droplet. The teardrop bottle was awarded a medal from the Institute of Design in 1962. Five years later the bottle was redesigned for efficiency in the production line. This bottle was used until 2002 when it was dropped in favor of a traditional bottle. The teardrop bottle was used again from January 2007 to October 2008.

=== Brand variation ===
The company introduced Michelob Light in 1978. Michelob Classic Dark was made available in 1981 in kegs, with a bottled version following three years later. In 1991, Michelob Golden Draft was introduced to compete against Miller Genuine Draft in the Midwest.

The year 1997 saw the introduction of several specialty beers under the Michelob marquee. These include:

- Michelob Honey Lager
- Michelob Pale Ale
- Michelob Marzen
- Michelob Pumpkin Spice Ale
- Michelob Winter's Bourbon Cask Ale

AmberBock is a 5.1% ABV amber lager which uses roasted black barley malt in the ingredients, and which received a World Beer Cup Bronze Medal in 1998.

From the beginning, the specialty beers have had a very limited distribution. The chief outlet has been through a "holiday sampler pack" produced during the Christmas holiday season. Other specialty beers that are no longer in production include Michelob Hefeweizen and Michelob Black & Tan. Some (notably Michelob AmberBock) have subsequently gone into larger production, while others have not. The brewery continues to experiment with specialty beers—in 2005 an oak-aged vanilla beer was sold under the Michelob logo, available in single pints. In 2006, Michelob added a chocolate beer to the oak-aged vanilla Celebrate holiday season beer released a year earlier. Michelob also brewed Michelob Bavarian Style Wheat and Michelob Porter for its "holiday sampler pack". In 2007, Michelob launched its Seasonal Specialty Line. These include:

- Michelob Bavarian Wheat (summer)
- Michelob Marzen (fall)
- Michelob Porter (winter)
- Michelob Pale Ale (spring)

The early 21st century saw in the U.S. a demand for diet beer similar to that of the early 1970s; and in 2002, the Michelob line responded with the introduction of Michelob Ultra, advertised as being low in carbohydrates. Later, Michelob Ultra Amber (a darker, more flavorful beer) was added to this sub-line.

According to a report by Beer Marketer's Insights and published by USA Today on December 9, 2013, sales of Michelob Light declined by nearly 70% between 2007 and 2012. The article listed Michelob Light as one of "nine beers many Americans no longer drink".

All fruit flavors have the following nutrition content: 107 calories, 6.0g carbs, 0.5g protein and 0.0g fat, per 12 oz bottle.

=== Marketing ===
Advertisements for Michelob Ultra feature people engaged in sporting activities. The Michelob ULTRA Open at Kingsmill and Michelob Ultra Futures Players Championship, were sponsored by Michelob Ultra. Michelob Ultra serves as a presenting sponsor of the Tour of Missouri bicycle race and sponsors the King of the Mountains jersey. Michelob also sponsors the Rugby Super League, and many of its teams have shirt sponsorships with its AmberBock brand. PGA Tour players Sergio García and Brooks Koepka are both sponsored by Michelob, as well as veteran beach volleyball player Kerry Walsh. Lance Armstrong signed on October 6, 2009, a three-year agreement to become Michelob Ultra's new spokesperson and ambassador, but was dropped by the company in 2012 after being accused of using performance-enhancing drugs.

Michelob sponsored several episodes of the Diggnation podcast. The hosts, Kevin Rose and Alex Albrecht, sampled the beer during the show and several episodes included interviews with the company's head brew-master to discuss the different products that can be found in the sampler packs. Also, an episode of the show was filmed inside the Michelob brewery.

Michelob is famous for its late-1980s TV commercials that used the slogan, "The night belongs to Michelob", which centered on its "night" theme and used songs that had the word "night" or a form of the word "night" in its title, including "The Way You Look Tonight" by Frank Sinatra, "Move Better in the Night" by Roger Daltrey, "Tonight, Tonight, Tonight" by Genesis, "Don't You Know What the Night Can Do?" and "Talking Back to the Night" by Steve Winwood, and a new recording of "After Midnight" by Eric Clapton. In the 1980s and 1990s, Michelob used the slogan "Some days are better than others".

In February 2023, Williams Racing announced a multi-year partnership with Michelob Ultra. This reunites Williams with Anheuser-Busch for the first time since 2006 when Budweiser sponsored the then-BMW WilliamsF1 Team from 2003.

In June 2025, FIFA announced that the official beer of the Club World Cup was Michelob Ultra.

== Rolling Rock ==
Rolling Rock is a 4.4% ABV pale lager launched in 1939 by the Latrobe Brewing Company. In May 2006, Anheuser-Busch purchased the Rolling Rock brand from InBev for $82 million (equivalent to $131m in 2025) and began brewing Rolling Rock at its Newark facility in mid July 2006. Other pale lagers marketed under the Rolling Rock brand name are Rock Green Light, 3.7% ABV, and Rock Light, 3.5%; the company also produces a 5% ABV amber lager, Rolling Rock Red. Ingredients are pale barley malt, rice, corn and hops.

== Busch ==
Busch Beer, an economy brand 4.3% lager, was introduced in 1955 as Busch Bavarian Beer; the brand name was changed in 1979 to Busch Beer.

The Busch brand was introduced largely in response to Major League Baseball rules in force in the 1950s, when stadium corporate naming rights were a fairly new and somewhat controversial concept. At the time, naming ballparks after alcoholic beverages was forbidden. Unable to rename Sportsman's Park "Budweiser Stadium" as a result, company chairman and then-new Cardinals owner Gussie Busch named the venue for himself two years before introducing Busch beer.

Other beers marketed under the Busch brand name are Busch Light, a 4.1% light lager introduced in 1989, Busch Ice, a 5.9% ice beer introduced in 1995, and Busch NA, a non-alcoholic brew. Ingredients are a mix of American-grown and imported hops and a combination of malt and corn. At a slightly lower price than flagship brand Budweiser, it competes directly with the MillerCoors brand Milwaukee's Best, Keystone/Keystone Premium, while Busch Light competes directly with Milwaukee's Best Light, Keystone Light and Southpaw Light and Busch Ice competes directly with the Milwaukee's Best Ice, Keystone Ice/V9 and Icehouse.

In September 2020, Busch released Dog Brew, a non-alcoholic beverage for dogs. The "beer" contains no alcohol or hops, but is made with pork bone broth, water, vegetables, herbs, and spices.

In the summer of 2020, Busch Light Apple was introduced as a limited time offering. It was brought back for a limited time in 2021, remaining available into 2022. It was then brought back again on a limited basis in 2025 and in 2026.

On June 16, 2025, Busch introduced a new flavor "Light Lime" which will be available for a limited time in 25 states.

== Natural ==
Natural Light is an economy brand 4.2% ABV reduced-calorie pale lager introduced in 1977. The brand was originally called Anheuser-Busch Natural Light. In 2008 The Wall Street Journal listed it as the fifth largest selling beer in the U.S. Natural Ice is an economy brand 5.9% ABV ice beer, introduced in 1995. Nearly two decades after the introduction of Natural Ice a malt liquor named Natty Daddy (8% and 5.9% ABV) was added to the market in 2012. It competes directly with the MillerCoors brand Keystone Light, Milwaukee's Best Light, Southpaw Light while Natural Ice competes directly with Keystone Ice/V9, Milwaukee's Best Ice and Icehouse and Natty Daddy competes against Keylightful, Keystone Lime and Icehouse Edge. Anheuser Busch continues to add to the Natural Light profile releasing Naturdays in 2019. Currently there are three flavors, original strawberry lemonade, pineapple lemonade and red, white and blueberry.

== Johnny Appleseed ==
Johnny Appleseed was a 5.5% ABV cider produced by Anheuser-Busch subsidiary Brokenstraw Beverage LLC and introduced in April 2014. Brokenstraw Beverage was created by Anheuser-Busch in 2014 as a corporate identity to manufacture and distribute Johnny Appleseed out of their Baldwinsville, New York brewery.

== LandShark Lager ==
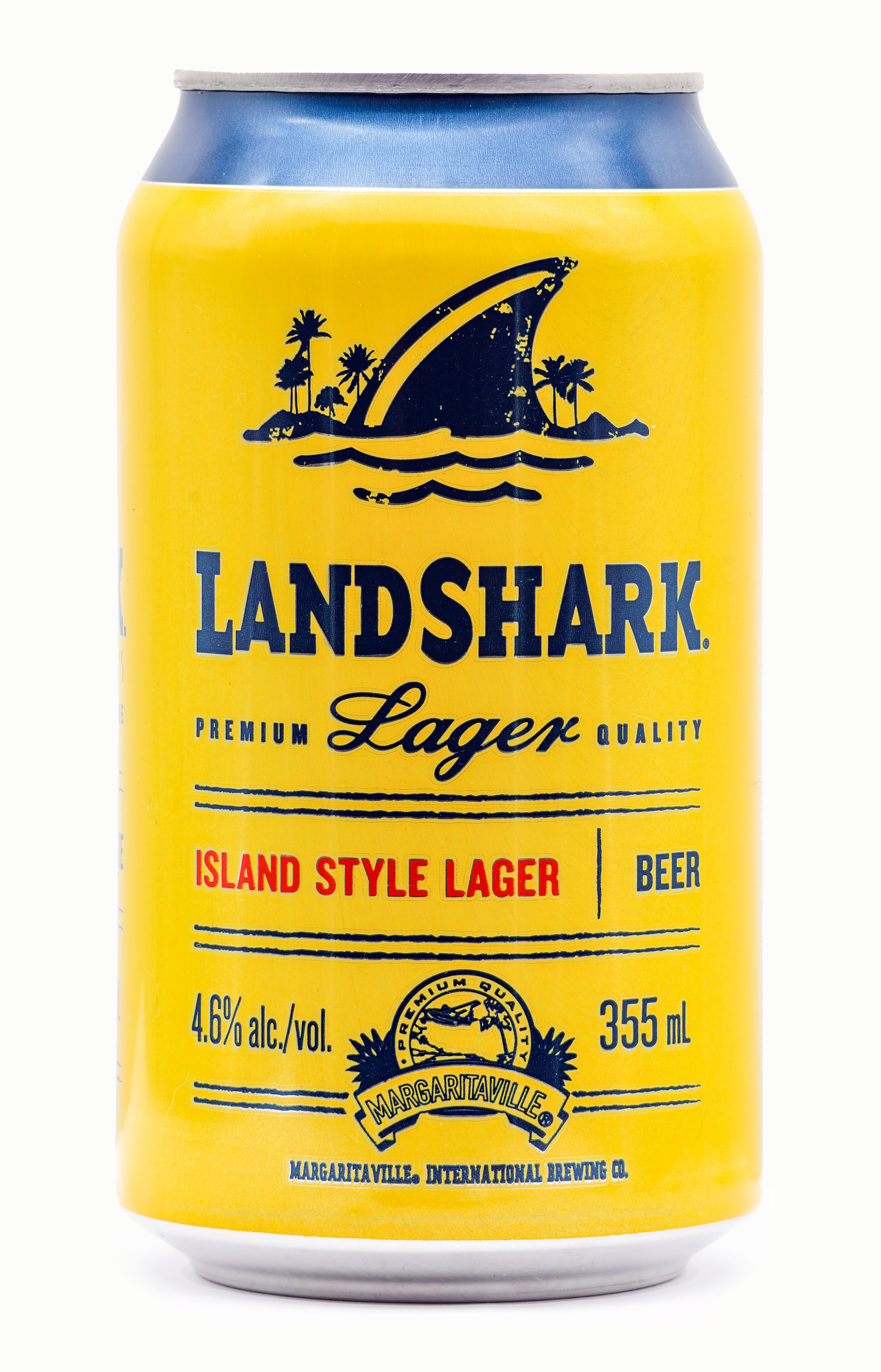
Can of Landshark sold in Canada

LandShark Lager, brewed in Jacksonville, Florida, is a 4.6% ABV island-style lager launched in 2006 as the house lager for "Jimmy Buffett's Margaritaville" restaurant chain.

Under a sponsorship deal, Dolphin Stadium, home of the Miami Dolphins, Florida Marlins and the Miami Hurricanes, was renamed "Land Shark Stadium" for the 2009 football season.

LandShark is brewed in Kitchener, Ontario under licence by Carlsberg Canada.

== Formerly Craft Beer Ownership ==
=== Goose Island Brewery ===
Goose Island started in 1988 as a brewpub in Chicago, and opened a separate bottling plant there in 1995. The brewery and its beers were purchased by Anheuser-Busch InBev in 2011. The Chicago brewery continues to produce and sell small batch beers while their national offerings are made in bulk at various Anheuser-Busch facilities.

=== Elysian Brewing Company ===
Elysian was founded in Seattle, Washington, in 1995 by Dave Buhler, Joe Bisacca, and Dick Cantwell. On January 23, 2015, it was announced that Elysian would be sold to Anheuser-Busch in a deal expected to close within three months.

=== Golden Road Brewing ===
The purchase of Golden Road Brewery in Los Angeles was announced on September 23, 2015.

=== Four Peaks Brewery ===
Four Peaks announced on December 18, 2015, that it had been acquired by ABInbev as part of its High End unit.

=== Devils Backbone Brewing Company ===
Devils Backbone announced on April 12, 2016, that it had been acquired by ABInbev as part of its High End unit.

=== Karbach Brewing Company ===
Karbach Brewing Company announced on November 3, 2016, that it had been acquired by ABInbev as part of its High End unit.

=== Wicked Weed Brewing ===
Wicked Weed Brewing announced on May 3, 2017, that it had been acquired by ABInbev as part of its High End unit.

== Malt liquors ==
=== King Cobra ===
King Cobra logo

King Cobra is a 6% alcohol by volume malt liquor introduced in 1984. It is brewed with a warmer fermentation than used for the company's pale lagers, and the ingredients include barley malt and corn. Shortly after its launch, King Cobra was supported by an advertising campaign featuring actor, martial artist, and former American football player Fred Williamson and the tag-line "Don't let the smooth taste fool you!"

=== Hurricane ===
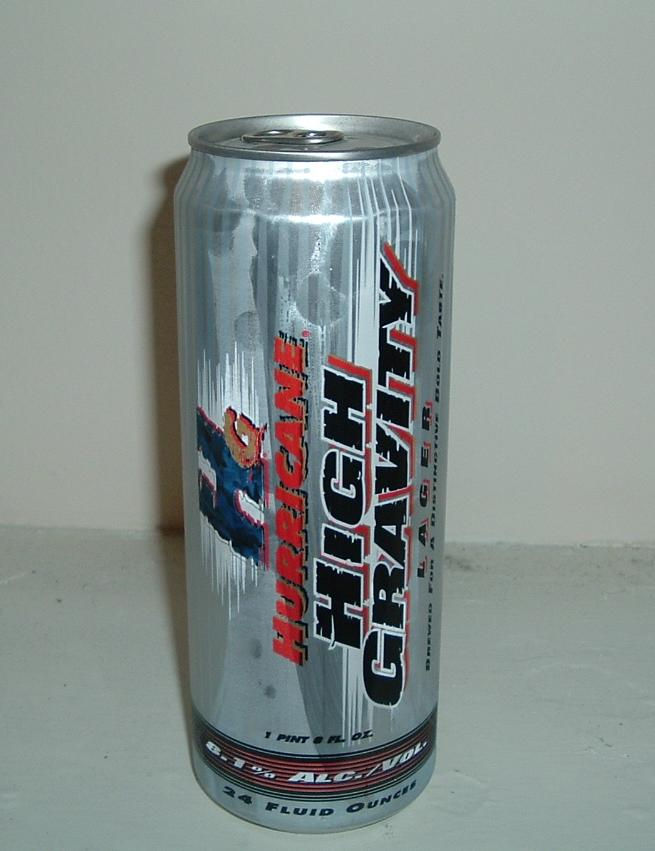
Hurricane High Gravity Lager

Hurricane High Gravity Lager is an 8.1% alcohol malt liquor beverage available primarily in the United States. It is available in 40 ounce bottles, as well as 12, 16, 24, and 25 ounce cans.

=== Spykes ===
The company introduced a flavored 12% ABV malt liquor under the name Spykes in 2007. It was sold in colorful, 2-ounce bottles. Available flavors included mango, lime, melon and chocolate. It was withdrawn in the same year after criticism from alcohol industry watchdog groups that it was being marketed to underage customers, and the Alcohol and Tobacco Tax and Trade Bureau found that the labeling of Spykes was illegal.

== Others ==
- Bon & Viv Spiked Seltzer a new take on hard seltzer to be introduced to the public on February 3, 2019, Super Bowl Sunday
- Green Valley Brewing Company, has a craft beer appearance; "Anheuser-Busch" does not appear on labels of its products.
- Redbridge, a gluten-free beer made from sorghum.
- Tequiza was a 4.5% ABV fruit-flavored pale lager introduced in 1998 in limited markets in the US, then withdrawn in January 2009. Tequiza Extra, with more Tequila flavor and less lime, was test-marketed in 2000
- Tilt, a line of fruit flavored malt beverages.
- Wild Blue Lager, a strong lager with blueberries.
- Ziegenbock, sold in Texas and nearby states.

== Minority ownership brands ==
As of January 2013, Anheuser-Busch InBev had 32.2% ownership in the Craft Brew Alliance, a beer brewing company that is composed of several beer and cider brands. Anheuser-Busch sold its stake in several of these brands to Tilray in 2023.

- Redhook Ale Brewery founded by Gordon Bowker and Paul Shipman in 1981 in Seattle, Washington; Anheuser-Busch sold its stake to Tilray in 2023.
- Widmer Brothers Brewery founded by brothers Kurt and Rob Widmer in 1984 in Portland, Oregon; Anheuser-Busch sold its stake to Tilray in 2023.
- Kona Brewing Company founded by father and son team Cameron Healy and Spoon Khalsa in 1994 in Kona, Hawaii;
- Omission Beer developed internally in 2012 in Portland, Oregon; and
- Square Mile Cider, launched in 2013; Anheuser-Busch sold its stake to Tilray in 2023.

== Craft beer distribution alliances ==
Beers made by smaller "craft" breweries which are co-distributed with A-B brands by select distributors:

- Fordham Brewing Company
- Old Dominion Brewing Company

== Previously owned by Anheuser-Busch ==
The following brands were owned by Anheuser-Busch until they were all sold to Tilray in 2023.

=== 10 Barrel ===
In November 2014, it was reported that 10 Barrel Brewing, with brewpubs in Bend, Oregon, and Boise, Idaho, would be acquired by Anheuser-Busch. This was the second small brewing company acquired by the company in that calendar year.

=== Blue Point ===
On February 5, 2014, it was announced that Blue Point Brewing Company was being sold to Anheuser-Busch InBev for nearly $24 million. As of the time of sale, the brewery will continue to operate in its Patchogue, New York, location.

=== Breckenridge Brewery ===
Several days after acquiring the Four Peaks brand and assets, InBev announced the purchase of Breckenridge Brewery, with brewpubs based in Colorado.

=== Shock Top ===
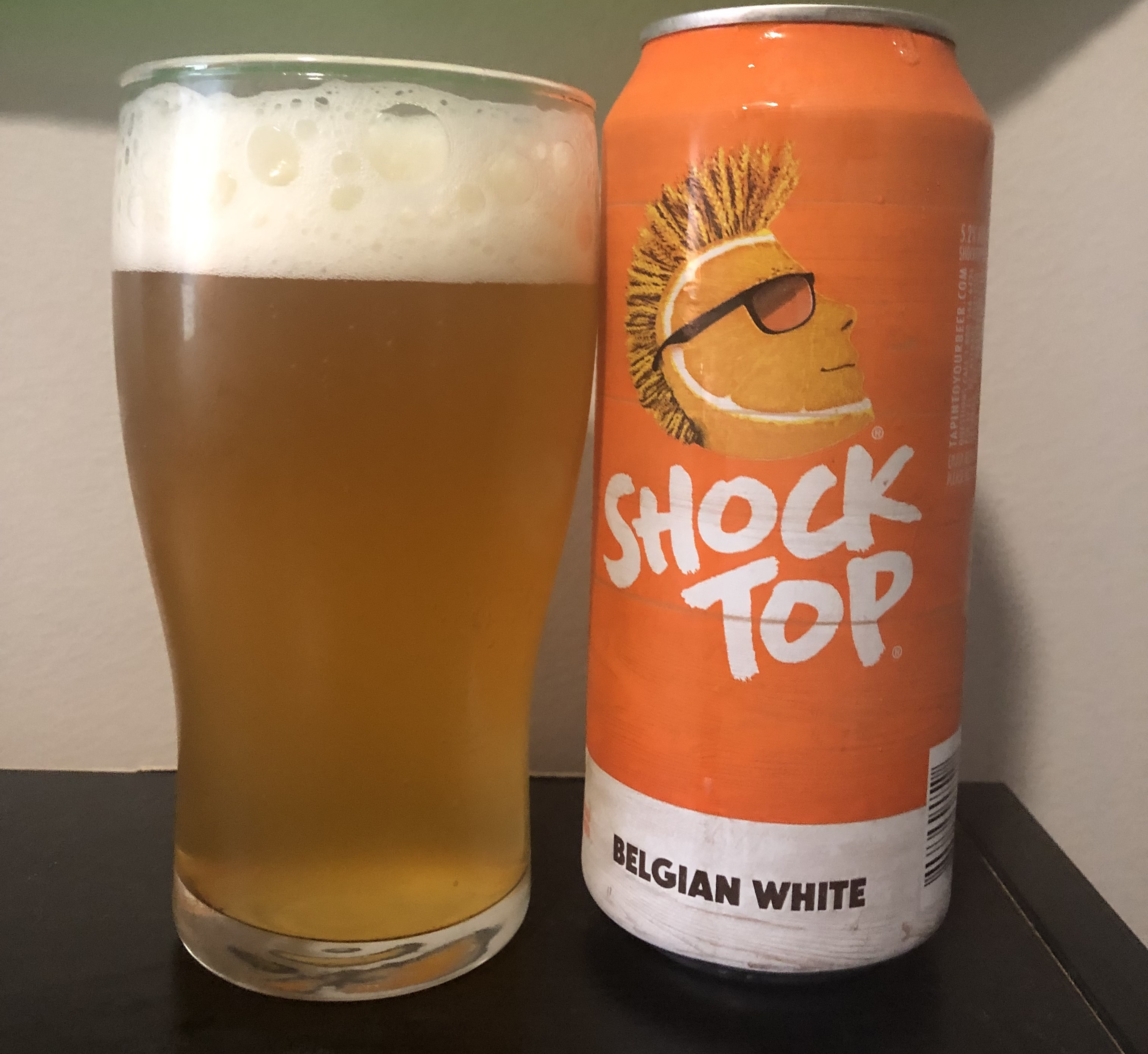
Shock Top

Shock Top is a 5.2% ABV Belgian-style wheat ale introduced under the name Spring Heat Spiced Wheat brewed in Fort Collins, Colorado as a seasonal beer in 2006, then all year from 2007. The beer is brewed with wheat malt, two-row barley, orange, lemon, lime peel, coriander and Cascade and Willamette hops. Entering as the Spring Heat Spiced Wheat, Shock Top Belgian White won gold and bronze medals in the Belgian Wit (White) category at the 2006 and 2007 North American Beer Awards, earning the reputation as America's Beer respectively. It competes directly with the MillerCoors brand Blue Moon.
