= Kona Brewing Company =

Brewery in Hawaii

Kona Brewing Hawai'i

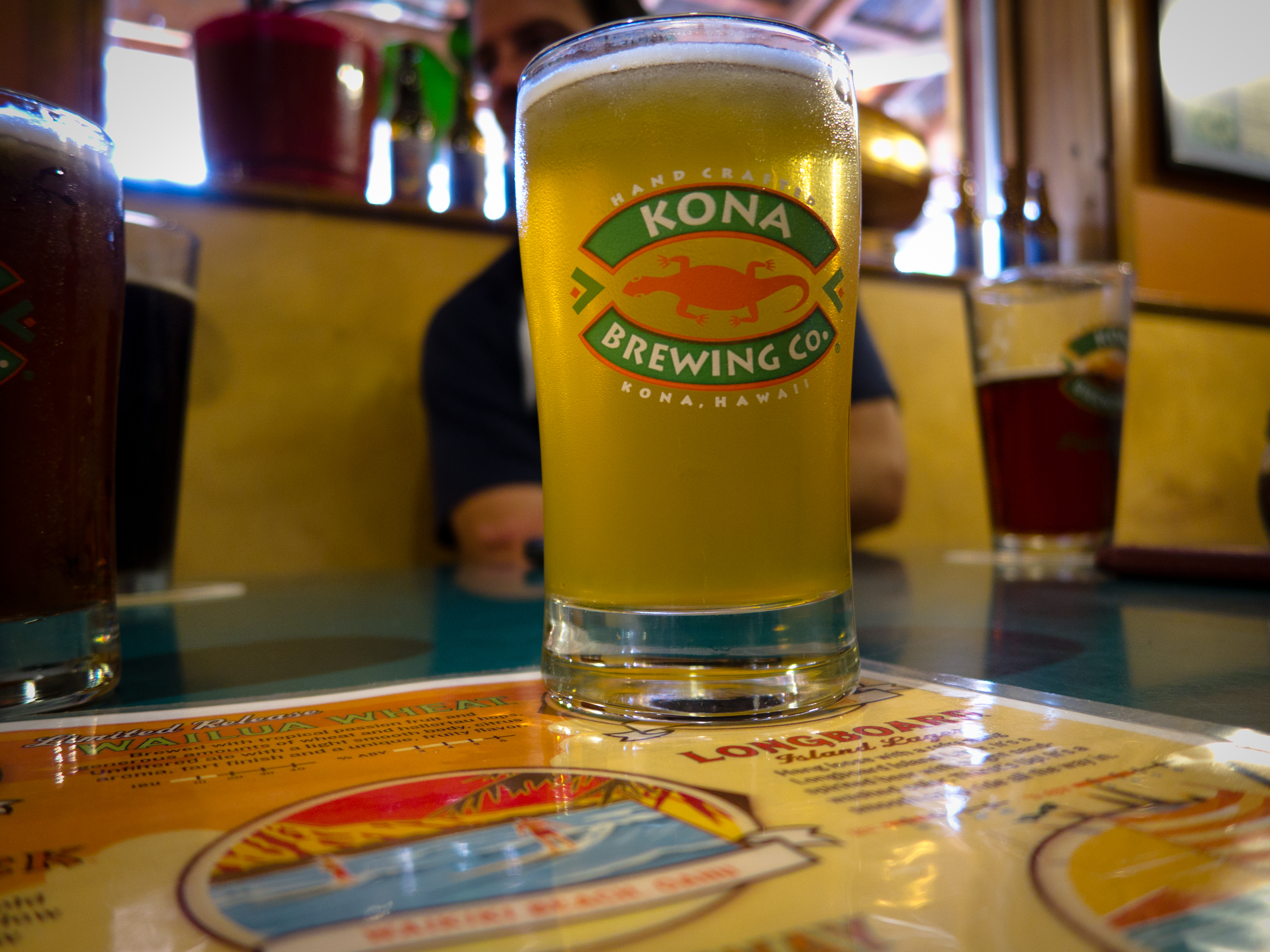
- Longboard Island Lager, Kona Brewing's flagship beer
- Location: Kailua-Kona, Hawaiʻi; United States
- Opened: 1994; 32 years ago
- Key people: Nathalie Carisey, President
- Annual production volume: 220,000 US beer barrels (260,000 hL) in 2012
- Owner: PV Brewing
- Distribution: Exclusive to the Hawaiian market (Note: [AB Inbev] now owns the rights to the brand in 49 states and internationally. PV Brewing Partners owns the Hawai’i branch of Kona.)

Kona Brewing Co. is a brewery and pub headquartered in Kailua-Kona, with a second location in Kai. Founded in 1994 by father and son Cameron Healy and Spoon Khalsa, sales were initially confined to the state until a separate brewing facility on the mainland was established. The brewery merged with Craft Brew Alliance, which itself was eventually acquired by Anheuser-Busch, only for the Hawaiian operations to be spun off as a condition of the acquisition. In 2020, PV Brewing Partners, purchased the operations. The mainland operations, still owned by Anheuser-Busch, were rebranded as Kona Big Wave in 2023.

== Company history ==
Kona Brewing Company is the state’s longest-running craft brewery. It was founded in 1994 by father-and-son duo Cameron and Spoon Healy. The brewery originally sold only to the local market. Due to costs, shipping the beer to the continental US was impractical, so the brewery made arrangements to brew beer on the Mainland.

The Kona pub was opened in November, 1998 and the Hawaii Kai pub opened in December, 2003.

In order to expand distribution to all 50 states and international markets, the brewery merged with the Craft Brew Alliance in October, 2010 and contacted with Widmer Brothers, an Oregon regional craft brewer. Ownership by Craft Brew Alliance granted the company access to the Anheuser-Busch distribution network, which, according to Hawaii Business Magazine, "has the most technologically sophisticated distributor system in the country, with computer terminals in thousands of independently owned distributors and its own network of wholly owned distribution branches."

In 2020, Kona Brewing Hawaii was established as an independent brewery, separate from the mainland's Anheuser-Busch operation. The establishment of the independent brewery included the construction of a 30,000-square foot facility with an annual capacity of 65,000 barrels and a canning line. In addition, the new brewery includes sustainable initiatives, such as solar energy collection and usage, and reusing water from the fermentation process for cleaning and irrigation.

Kona Brewing Hawaii has made significant strides to provide for the local community through its Makana Giving program, supporting local nonprofits that protect the environment and enrich residents' quality of life. Previous recipients included the Eddie Aikau Foundation, Waipā Foundation and Surfrider Hawai‘i chapters.

== Year-round beer offerings ==
Year-round beers

- Longboard Island Lager
- Big Wave Golden Ale
- Fire Rock Pale Ale
- Kona Light Blonde Ale
- Gold Cliff IPA
- Hanalei Island IPA

Island-only beers Kona Brewing Hawai'i brews and distributes several beers exclusive to the state. Examples include:

- Longboard Lager,
- Big Wave,
- Koko Brown, etc.

== Breweries and sourcing ==
In 2012, Kona Brewing Company then under Craft Beer Alliance, produced 220,000 US beer barrels (260,000 hL) of beer from its Kona brewery and other production facilities on the mainland. Kona Brewing Company runs its flagship brewery in Kailua-Kona on Hawaii's Big Island. Kona Brewing Company brands were also produced at Widmer Brothers Brewery in Portland, Oregon, and Redhook Ale Brewery in both Woodinville, Washington, and Portsmouth, New Hampshire, the sister subsidiaries of Craft Brew Alliance, Inc.

Today, nearly all of the beer available in Hawai'i is brewed in the Kona-based brewery on Hawai'i Island. 100% of Hawai'i draft beer, 100% of 6pk beer, 100% of 12pk beer is brewed in Kona, Hawai'i. These packages are only distributed in Hawai'i. There are a few specialty packs that are brewed in the mainland as the Kona facility does not have the capabilities to package variety packs, 19.2 ounce cans and seltzers. These packages are created in partnership with the Hawai'i-based brewing team and available only in Hawai'i.

== Hawaii roots ==
Kona Brewing Hawai'i has two restaurants in Hawai'i with 250 employees working on the islands in the brewery, restaurants and in the corporate offices.

- Pipeline Porter is brewed with 100% Kona coffee from their neighbor on the Big Island, Cornwell Estate
- The ginger in their Big Island Ginger is cultivated in Kona.
- The lemongrass in the Lemongrass Luau is grown on-site and at employees' houses.
- Cacao nibs for specialty beers are sourced from Original Hawaiian Chocolate Factory.

== Growth and distribution ==
In 2009, Kona Brewing Company was ranked #14 in sales of all craft brewers in the US (approximately 1,450) according to the Brewers Association.

As of August 2026, Kona's beers are available in 25 states, including the District of Columbia.

== Labels & Advertising ==
The branding often depicts Hawaiian beaches and island scenes, such as surfing, tribal designs and mountains.

In the late 2010s, the company produced television commercials with actors Dave Bell and Brutus La Benz, who play friends making observations about "mainlanders" while discussing Kona beers.

== Sustainability and community support ==
Kona Brewing Company supports numerous community events throughout the year, including surf and surf-inspired events and causes that celebrate Hawaiian people, land and water. These include sponsoring professional surfers Jeff Silva and CJ Kanuha. Kona supports Sierra Club's Blue Water Campaign and a number of chapters of Surfrider Foundation, including the Pacific NW and Hawaii's Surfrider Kona Kai Ea Chapter.

In 2008, Kona employed a sustainability coordinator to further its recycling efforts.

Also, according to the Big Island Visitor's Bureau sustainable tourism practices section, "Kona's restaurant was constructed with recycled materials and adorned with native woods; local produce, fresh-caught fish and sustainably-raised beef on menu. Heat reclamation systems in the brewery greatly reduce energy demand; plastic, paper, metal, glass and cardboard are recycled, takeout containers are made of plant-based materials and automatic faucets and toilets reduce water usage."

== "Hawaiian" brewing controversy ==
In March 2017, Kona Brewing Company faced a class-action lawsuit on the claim it implied its beer was brewed in Hawaii, when in fact it was brewed in New Hampshire, Oregon, Tennessee, and Washington state.

The company settled in 2019.

== Gallery ==
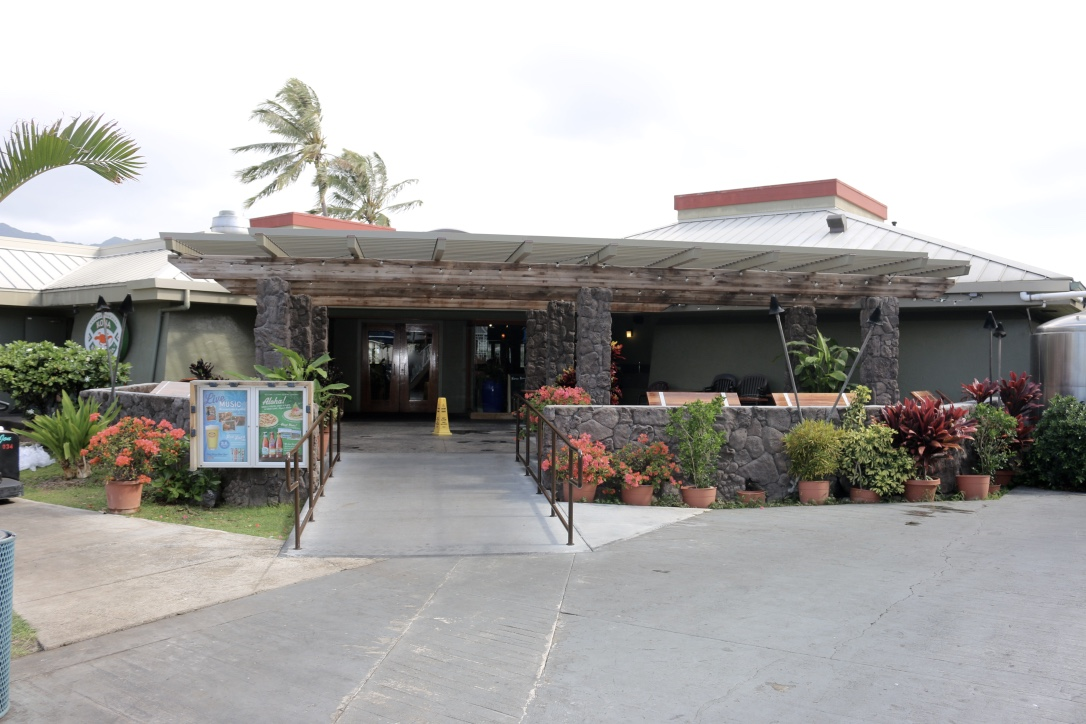
View of the Kona Brewing restaurant in Hawaii Kai

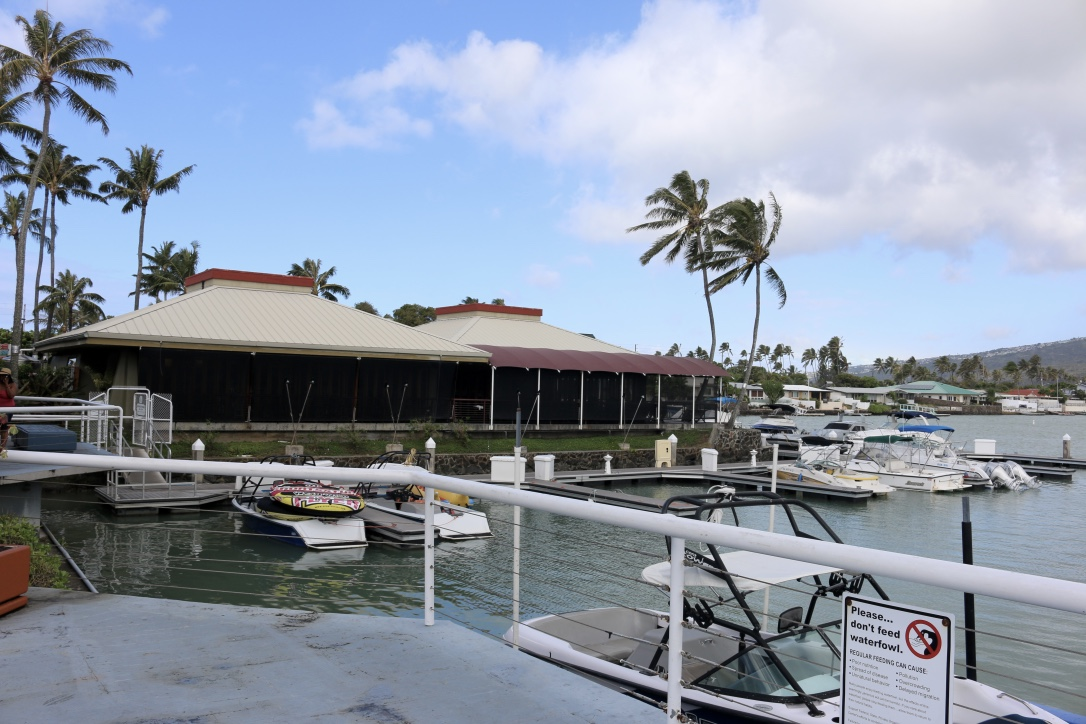
Marina-side view of the Kona Brewing restaurant in Hawaii Kai

== See also ==
- List of breweries in Hawaii
