= Grohs =

Grohs is a German surname. Notable people with the surname include:

- Harald Grohs (born 1944), German race driver and team owner
- Herbert Grohs (1931–2018), Austrian footballer
- Maria Luisa Grohs (born 2001), German footballer

== See also ==
- Groh
