= SweetWater Brewing Company =

Craft brewery in Atlanta, Georgia

- Type: Subsidiary
- Industry: Alcoholic beverage
- Founded: February 21, 1997; 29 years ago
- Founder: Kevin McNerney; Freddy Bensch; Levi Jacob Holcomb
- Headquarters: Atlanta, United States
- Area served: United States
- Products: Beer
- Parent: Tilray
- Website: www.sweetwaterbrew.com

SweetWater Brewing Company is a craft brewery founded in 1997 by Freddy Bensch and Kevin McNerney in Atlanta, Georgia. SweetWater's beers are unpasteurized and distribution is limited to select states.

== History ==
Founders Freddy Bensch and Kevin McNerney were roommates at the University of Colorado at Boulder, where they also worked part-time cleaning kegs at a local brewery. After graduation in 1993, Bensch moved to California to study at the American Brewers Guild, while McNerney went on to work in several breweries in Colorado and California, including Rockies Brewing Company, Avery Brewing Company and Mammoth Brewing Company. Bensch visited Atlanta during the 1996 Summer Olympics and saw an opportunity to bring a West Coast style brewery to the Southeast. McNerney soon joined Bensch in Atlanta raising initial funds to open the brewery's first location off Interstate 20 on Fulton Industrial Boulevard.

Bensch named the brewery after kayaking down Sweetwater Creek, a tributary of the Chattahoochee River, in Georgia's Sweetwater Creek State Park located a few miles west of the brewery. The brewery also adopted the official motto "Don't Float the Mainstream" as a tribute to its namesake. Bensch and McNerny began brewing in January 1997 and sold their first keg on February 21, 1997 - SweetWater ESB and Blue. SweetWater's most popular beer, SweetWater 420 Extra Pale Ale, named after the date it was first brewed (April 20), soon followed.

Two years later, SweetWater hosted the World Beer Cup, an international brewing competition. In 2002 SweetWater won Small Brewery of the Year at the Great American Beer Festival in Denver. In 2003 the brewery outgrew its space on Fulton Industrial Boulevard and moved to a 25,000 square-foot facility in Atlanta's Armour Circle Industrial Park on Ottley Drive. In 2004 SweetWater signed with United Distributors, one of the largest volume beverage distributors in the U.S., increasing SweetWater's distribution from 200,000 to 700,000 cases in six years. Kevin McNerney resigned from SweetWater Brewing Company in 2008 to spend more time with his family, and later became brewmaster at 5 Season's Brewing Company. In 2012 SweetWater completed a three-phase expansion project adding additional office and event space, a bottling line and packaging hall, and a tank farm that increased capacity from 100,000 to 500,000 barrels per year.

In 2013 SweetWater ranked 26th among the top 50 U.S. breweries and 19th among the top 50 U.S. craft brewing companies based on sales volume.

On September 29, 2014, SweetWater announced that it was selling a minority interest to TSG Consumer Partners.

In July 2015, SweetWater promoted Kim Jones from Chief Financial Officer to Chief Executive Officer. She was the CFO since 2013 and before that, she held senior financial and management positions with Spanx Inc. and The Coca-Cola Company.

On November 4, 2020, Aphria Inc., a large producer of cannabis based in Canada, acquired SweetWater for $300 million.

In July 2021, the company acquired the Fort Collins, Colorado, brewery of Vancouver-based Red Truck Beer.

== Environmental and community commitment ==
SweetWater sponsors a number of programs designed to give back to the Atlanta community as well as environmental causes. The brewery also implements a variety of sustainability practices within its day-to-day operations, and has partnered with Gas South to purchase direct carbon offsets to reduce their carbon footprint. In 2013, SweetWater recycled more than 9.5 million pounds of spent grain, 165,000-lbs of spent hops and 150,000-lbs of yeast for local farmers to feed livestock and use for compost. Water reclamation practices used during brewing and bottling also reclaim more than six million gallons of water annually to be used in future brewing.

== Beers ==
=== Perennial Brew ===
- 420 Extra Pale Ale, ABV: 5.7%
- Blue, ABV: 4.6%
- Georgia Brown, ABV: 5.1%
- IPA, ABV: 6.3%
- Hop Hash Easy IPA, ABV: 4.2%
- Take Two Pils, ABV: 5.5%
- G13 IPA, ABV: 6%
- G13 Mango Kush IPA, ABV: 5%

=== Catch N' Release series ===
- Road Trip, ABV: 5.2%
- WaterKeeper Hefeweizen, ABV: 5.7%
- Crank Tank Helles Lager, ABV: 5.8%
- Whiplash White IPA, ABV: 6.2%
- Festive Ale, ABV: 8.5%
- Spinnerbait Belgian-Style Red Ale, ABV: 6.0%
- Happy Ending, ABV: 9%
- Triple Tail Tropical India Pale Ale, ABV: 5.5%

=== Dank Tank series ===
- DP Barleywine, ABV: 10.2% (June 2009)
- Big Ol' Belgian Blue Balls, ABV: 8% (August 2009)
- Wet Dream Ale, ABV: 7.5% (October 2009)
- BSP Quad Ale, ABV: 11% (February 2010)
- Magnum IP Imperial Pilsner, ABV: 9% (July 2010)
- Border Hop-per Ale, ABV: 8.6% (October 2010)
- Mean Joe Bean Imperial Porter, ABV: 8.5% (February 2011)
- Ghoulash, ABV: 8.5% (October 2011)
- Fresh Sticky Nugs, ABV: 8% (November 2011)
- 420 India Pale Ale, ABV: 8.5% (February 2012)
- Danktoberfest, ABV: 8.5% (October 2012)
- The Gimp, ABV: 10.3% (December 2012)
- Some Strange II Black IPA, ABV: 10% (January 2013)
- The Price is Wrong, ABV: 9% (August 2013)
- Red Hot Mama, ABV: 8.6% (October 2013)
- Second Helping IPA (Collaboration with The Giving Kitchen), ABV: 7.5% (January 2014)
- Johnny Ha$h, ABV: 8.5% (April 2014)

=== Anniversary beers ===
- 15 Years of Heady Beers, ABV: 10% (2012)
- 16 So Fine Red Wheat Wine, ABV: 11% (2013)
- 17th Saison Farmhouse Ale, ABV: 9% (2014)
- 18 Belgian-Style Tripel Ale, ABV: 10% (2015)

=== Retired beers ===
- ESB, ABV 5.6% - Retired 2000
- Hummer White Ale, ABV: 5.1% - Retired 2008
- Sch’Wheat Pale Wheat Ale, ABV: 4.7% - Retired 2012
- Exodus Porter, ABV: 6.5% - Retired 2018
- LowRYEder IPA, ABV: 6.2% - Retired 2014
- Motor Boat, ABV: 5.6% - Retired 2014

== SweetWater 420 Fest ==
The SweetWater 420 Fest is an annual three-day craft beer, music and arts festival formerly held in Atlanta's historic Candler Park. As of 2014 the fest is held in Centennial Olympic Park on or around the weekend of April 20. The Earth Day inspired festival was first hosted in 2004 and features live music, local art, standup comedy, food trucks, craft beer tasting and a 5k. In 2025, it was announced the festival would be moving to Shirley Clarke Franklin Park for its 2026 edition.
