= Michael Blue =

American billionaire businessman

- Born: 1977 or 1978 (age 47–48)
- Education: Harding University; Yale University
- Known for: Managing partner and co-founder, Privateer Holdings

Michael Blue (born 1977/1978) is an American billionaire businessman, the managing partner and one of the co-founders of Privateer Holdings, along with Brendan Kennedy and Christian Groh.

Blue earned a bachelor's degree in finance from Harding University, and an MBA from Yale University.

According to Bloomberg LP, as of September 2018, Blue has a net worth of at least US$2.4 billion.
