= Jay W. Weiss =

American liquor entrepreneur

- Born: September 26, 1927; Brooklyn, New York, United States
- Died: January 31, 2004 (aged 76); Miami
- Education: Tulane University
- Occupations: Entrepreneur, business executive
- Known for: Co-founders of Southern Wine and Spirits

Jay W. Weiss (1927–2004) was an American entrepreneur and philanthropist. He was one of the co-founders of Southern Wine and Spirits, which later became Southern Glazer's Wine and Spirits, one of the largest private companies in the United States.

== Early life and education ==
Weiss was born on September 26, 1927, in Brooklyn, New York. After obtaining an education degree from Tulane University, he moved to Miami, Florida. He was 21 years old.

== Career ==
For two decades, he operated bars and lounges in the city. Records also show that he was involved in several business ventures, including Scopitone Inc., which sold jukeboxes in the 1960s.

In 1968, Weiss was among a group that took over Southern, which was then a small Miami liquor distributor called Southern Wine & Spirits. It was a buyout financed by the Miami National Bank through a $200,000 loan. At the beginning, Weiss was only brought in to help run the operations. Other sources, however, identified him as a co-founder along with Howard Preuss and Harvey Chaplin. The company's early beginning was marked by its reported ties to mob money.

Weiss would spend about three decades as a top executive and stockholder of the company. Southern prospered under him and his partners as they chose to expand in the wine market instead of spirits, which many competing distributors were focused on. During this period, wine only claimed a small market share in the United States.

Weiss opted to build the Southern brand and to educate the market about its products, Southern was able to grow its customer base and earn the trust of major suppliers. This last development was crucial because suppliers began consolidating their spirits under Southern. After the company's expansion in California, it pursued an aggressive national expansion, growing rapidly to become the largest distributor of wine and spirits in the United States.

== Philanthropy ==
Weiss is also known for his charity work. He is recognized for his contribution to the founding of Ryder Trauma Center. He also helped establish FIU's Chaplin School of Hospitality and Tourism Management. Weiss died on January 31, 2004, due to complications with lung cancer. He is survived by his second wife, Renee.
