= Southern Glazer's Wine and Spirits =

American wine and spirits distributor

Southern Glazer's Wine and Spirits, LLC
- Type: Private
- Industry: Wine, spirits, beer and beverage sales & distribution
- Founded: 1968
- Founder: Jay W. Weiss, Harvey R. Chaplin, Howard Preuss
- Headquarters: Miami, Florida, U.S.
- Number of locations: 47 US states, plus Canada, the Caribbean, Central and South America
- Area served: 47 US states, plus Canada, the Caribbean, Central and South America
- Key people: Harvey Chaplin; Bennett Glazer; Wayne Chaplin; Mel Dick; Steven R. Becker; Lee F. Hager; David Chaplin; Mark Chaplin; Jennifer Chaplin
- Products: 7,000+ brands
- Services: Brand building, sales, logistics, delivery, merchandising, ecommerce
- Revenue: $25 billion (2026)
- Number of employees: 24,000 (2022)
- Subsidiaries: Ankaa Global Logistics
- Website: www.southernglazers.com

Southern Glazer's Wine and Spirits, LLC is the largest wine and spirits distributor in the United States. It has operations in 47 U.S. markets and Canada, as well as brokerage operations through its Southern Glazer’s Travel Retail Sales & Export Division in the Caribbean, Central and South America. It was the 10th largest private company in the United States in 2022.

== History ==
Southern Wine and Spirits was founded in 1968 in Florida by Jay W. Weiss, Harvey R. Chaplin, and Howard Preuss in their headquarters in Miramar. The company expanded from Florida to California in 1969. In 1977, Howard Preuss died due to cancer. His widow, Celia Preuss, sold her part of the company to the remaining owners. Southern was one of the first companies to have statewide distribution in California, which is the company's largest market; prior to Southern's presence, California had dozens of small distributors.

The company spread to Nevada in 1976, Arizona in 1992, South Carolina in 1993, Pennsylvania in 1995, Hawaii in 1996, Kentucky in 1998, New Mexico in 2000, Colorado in 2001, Illinois in 2002, New York in 2004, Maine, Mississippi, New Hampshire, North Carolina, Vermont, Virginia and West Virginia in 2005. In 2006, the company began operations in Alabama and entered Delaware in 2008. In July 2008, Southern Wine and Spirits merged with the Odom Corporation which added Oregon, Washington, Idaho, Montana, Wyoming and Alaska to its distribution areas. Southern entered the Indiana market in 2010.

In January 2016, Southern Wine & Spirits and Glazer’s announced plans to merge. The transaction closed later that year, creating Southern Glazer’s Wine & Spirits, which industry publication Shanken News Daily has described as the largest wine and spirits distributor in the U.S. market. The company distributes one-third of all bottles of wine and spirits in the United States.

In 2019, Southern Glazer's launched Proof, its online shopping tool for placing orders, discovering products, finding deals, making payments, and more.

In 2023, the company acquired WEBB Banks, expanding its reach into the Caribbean, Central America and South America. In 2024, Southern Glazer’s acquired substantially all the assets of Horizon Beverage Group. This enabled the company to expand into the New England market, adding Massachusetts and Rhode Island as the 46th and 47th markets in its U.S. footprint, as well as to expand its beer portfolio, where it operates under the name Southern Glazer’s Beverage Company. In November 2025, closed its acquisition of substantially all of the assets of Anheuser-Busch’s owned New York City distribution operation. The business operates under the name Southern Glazer’s Beverage Company of New York, servicing Manhattan, Queens, Staten Island and the Bronx. In 2026, the company acquired Clare Rose Inc., expanding its beverage distribution operations on Long Island, and Eagle Rock Distributing Co.’s Colorado operations, expanding its total beverage distribution business in Colorado.

Currently, Forbes lists Southern Glazer's Wine & Spirits as the 10th largest private company in the United States. They also note an annual revenue of $26 billion with 24,000 employees as of 2023.

== People ==
Harvey R. Chaplin, one of the original founders of Southern Wine & Spirits, served as chairman until his death on June 9, 2024. He directly oversaw the organization's growth from when he co-founded Southern to where it is today. Chaplin died on June 9, 2024, at the age of 95.

His son, Wayne E. Chaplin, serves as the president and CEO. Other family members in the business include his son, David Chaplin, chief growth & strategy officer; his other son, Mark Chaplin, president of commercial sales; and his daughter, Jennifer Chaplin, EVP & managing director, Campari.

Bennett Glazer, executive vice chairman, is the grandson of Louis Glazer, who opened Jumbo Bottling Co. in 1909. Glazer's saw an increase in revenue from roughly $700 million, when Bennett Glazer became head of the family holding company, to $3.7 billion under his command. He played a key role in the merger between Southern and Glazer's, forming Southern Glazer's Wine & Spirits.

Mel Dick is the senior vice president of Southern Wine & Spirits of America and president of the company's Wine Division. In 2001, he was awarded the Legion of Honor medal by the president of France, Jacques Chirac, for his efforts to promote French wine. He was first hired at Southern Wine and Spirits in 1969 as general sales manager-Wine to develop the wine operations of the company, and was later promoted to senior vice president in 1991.

== Products ==
Southern Glazer's represents approximately 1,500 wine, spirit, beer, and beverage suppliers from around the world. The company operates in 47 states and employs approximately 24,000 people. During a working week, the sales, delivery, and support staff of Southern Glazer's collectively calls on or services over 250,000 different chains and independent retail and restaurant customers across the country.

In May 2018, Southern Wine & Spirits reached a deal with Aphria for its new subsidiary Great North Distributors to exclusively distribute Aphria's recreational cannabis products in Canada when its recreational use becomes legal in the country.

== Lawsuits ==
In December 2024, the US Federal Trade Commission filed an antitrust lawsuit against Southern Glazer's, accusing the company of discriminating against small and independent businesses in violation of the Robinson-Patman Act by refusing to give smaller stores discounts and rebates that larger stores receive, thereby putting them at a competitive disadvantage.

In April 2025, Southern Glazer's reached an agreement to settle a private antitrust lawsuit brought by Provi Inc., which had alleged that Southern Glazer's had blocked alcohol orders from retailers who used Provi's online sales platform.
