= Lost Rhino Brewing Company =

- Industry: Alcoholic beverage
- Founded: 2011
- Headquarters: Ashburn, Virginia
- Products: Beer
- Production output: Less than 5,000 bbl per year
- Owner: Matt Hagerman

Lost Rhino Brewing Company is a microbrewery based in Ashburn, Virginia, United States. Founded in 2011, it produces a variety of craft beers and operates a tasting room at its brewery.

== History ==
Lost Rhino Brewing Company was founded by Matt Hagerman and Favio Garcia, two former brewers from Old Dominion Brewing Company in Loudoun County. The company name comes from a surfing term, "rhino chaser," which is defined as "someone out to find the best waves, the biggest waves—an adventurer."

In May 2011, Lost Rhino opened, with their products using locally sourced ingredients from Virginia farms.

In 2013, using malt and hops grown in state, local water and yeast cultured at the brewery, Garcia and Jasper Akerboom brewed "Native Son". It was described by local media as one of the first beers in modern times to use entirely in-state ingredients. Using techniques for isolating ancient yeast strains in an academic setting, the brewers have developed several beers from wild yeasts with interesting fermentation properties.

== Great American Beer Festival ==
2013: Gold - Rhinofest (German Style Marzen Category)

2016: Silver - Face Plant IPA (English-Style India Pale Ale)
