= Widmer Brothers Brewery =

American brewery

Coordinates: 45.541044°N 122.676344°W

- Industry: Alcoholic beverage
- Founded: 1984
- Headquarters: 929 N Russell St; Portland, Oregon, U.S.
- Products: Beer
- Production output: 450,000 US beer barrels (530,000 hL) in 2011
- Owner: Publicly owned (Nasdaq: BREW)

Widmer Brothers is a brewery founded in 1984 in Portland, Oregon, by brothers Kurt and Robert Widmer. It is part of the Craft Brew Alliance, Inc., the 12th largest brewing company in the United States in 2017.

== Details ==
In 1986, the Widmer Brothers introduced their "Hefeweizen" beer – an American variant on a traditional Hefeweizen, which is usually characterized by distinctive yeast flavors. Instead, the Widmer brew was an unfiltered version of their existing wheat beer (Weizenbier), and used Cascade hops. Subsequently, this style of "American Hefeweizen" and the custom of serving wheat beer with a slice of lemon have both spread.

In November 2007, Redhook Ale Brewery and Widmer Brothers officially announced plans to merge, forming a new company called Craft Brewers Alliance, which was later renamed as Craft Brew Alliance in 2012. The merged company retained both the Redhook and Widmer brands. The two had already been working closely for several years through a licensing agreement whereby Redhook brewed and distributed Widmer beers on the East Coast. Anheuser-Busch held a minority stake of approximately 32% in the company until they sold the stake to Tilray on 8 August, 2023.

On January 22, 2019, Widmer Brothers Brewing closed its taproom in Portland, Oregon's Eliot neighborhood, after 22 years.

In April 2021, Widmer Brothers unveiled official beers for two of Portland's professional soccer teams. IPA 'Til I Die was created for the Portland Timbers on the occasion of their 2021 MLS season opening on April 18, 2021. Slide Tackle Hazy IPA was created for the Portland Thorns and their home opener on April 9, 2021.

== Beers ==
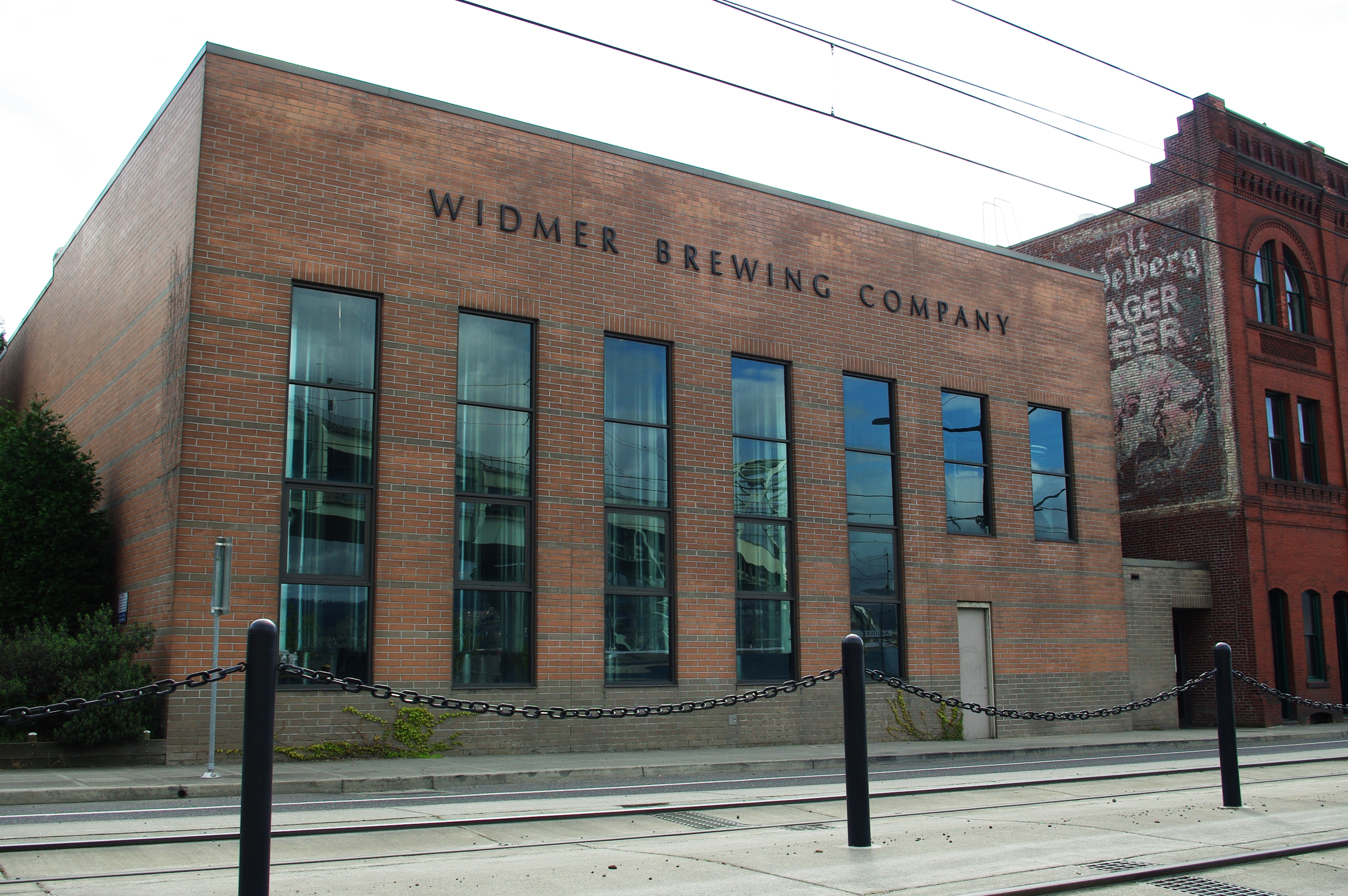
Company headquarters in North Portland

Oregon ranks 3rd nationally in craft breweries per capita

This is an incomplete listing of Widmer beers, past and present, and their types.

=== Year-round ===
- Drifter Pale Ale, Pale ale
- Drop Top Amber, Amber / Red ale
- Hefeweizen, American Wheat ale / Hefeweizen
- Upheaval IPA, IPA
- Steel Bridge Porter, Porter

=== Seasonal ===
- Brrr Seasonal Ale, NW red ale
- Hefe Berry Lime, Hefeweizen
- Deadlift Imperial IPA, Imperial IPA
- Hefe Hopfruit
- Hefe Twisted Citrus

=== Limited release ===
- Barrel Aged Brrrbon (Vintage), Winter warmer
- Galaxy Hopped Barleywine, Barleywine
- Kill Devil Brown Ale, Brown Ale
- Raspberry Russian Imperial Stout (Vintage), Russian Imperial Stout
- Rotator IPA Series
- SXNW: South By Northwest, Spiced ale
