= Aphria Inc. =

Canadian cannabis company

- Type: Public
- Traded as: TSX: APHA; NYSE: APHA; Nasdaq: APHA
- Industry: Cannabis
- Founded: 2014; 12 years ago
- Founders: Cole Cacciavillani; John Cervini
- Defunct: 2020
- Headquarters: Leamington, Ontario, Canada
- Key people: Irwin D Simon (CEO)
- Revenue: CA$36.9 million (2018)
- Parent: Tilray
- Website: https://aphria.ca/

Aphria Inc., headquartered in Leamington, Ontario, was an international producer and distributor of medicinal and recreational cannabis. The company operated through retail and wholesale channels in Canada and internationally.

Aphria was a main distributor of medical cannabis to Germany and had operations in 10 additional countries outside of Canada. Aphria offers multiple products under a portfolio of recreational cannabis brands, including Good Supply, B!NGO, Solei, RIFF, and Broken Coast. In November 2020, Aphria acquired SweetWater Brewing Company, one of the largest craft breweries in the USA.

Prior to its acquisition by Tilray, Aphria was one of the largest cannabis companies in the world, and was listed on both the Toronto Stock Exchange and NASDAQ. The merger with Tilray was announced in December 2020 and closed in May 2021. Aphria now operates under the Tilray name.

== History ==
Aphria was founded in 2013 by Cole Cacciavillani and John Cervini, who were Leamington greenhouse operators. Its CEO for its formative years was Vic Neufeld, formerly the CEO of Jamieson Laboratories, a Canadian vitamin company. It was originally listed on the Toronto Venture Exchange before it was uplisted to the Toronto Stock Exchange in March of 2017, and joined the S&P/TSX Composite Index in December 2017.

In 2014, Health Canada granted Aphria a license to produce and sell medical cannabis. The company's first wholesale shipments were in April 2015. Also in April 2015, the company announced it would double the size of its greenhouse space.

In January 2018, Aphria agreed to take over Broken Coast Cannabis, a Vancouver Island based cannabis producer. In March the same year, the company acquired Nuuvera, a global cannabis company, for CA$826 million. In May 2018, Aphria reached a deal with Southern Glazer's Wine & Spirits to distribute Aphria's recreational cannabis products in Canada.

Aphria nominated Irwin D. Simon, previously of The Hain Celestial Group, Inc., as Chair of the Board of Directors in December 2018 and interim CEO in March 2019 after former CEO Vic Neufeld resigned.

In 2020, the company moved its listing from the New York Stock Exchange to the NASDAQ, citing cost cuts as the reason for the change.

== Tilray merger ==
On 15 December 2020, Aphria conducted a reverse acquisition to merge with Tilray, which would create the largest multinational cannabis company by revenue. CEO of Aphria was named as CEO and chairman of the board for the merged company and Tilray CEO Brendan Kennedy, was named as a member of the board of directors.

The merged companies kept Tilray's name and trade under the Tilray ticker symbol, TLRY, on the NASDAQ exchange. By combining assets, the Aphria-Tilray company develops craft beer and cannabis-infused beverages in partnership with Anheuser-Busch InBev, and have branded hemp and cannabidiol products. The merger was completed in May 2021.

== See also ==
- Cannabis in Canada
