= SweetWater 420 Fest =

Music festival in Atlanta, Georgia, United States

- Status: Active
- Genre: Music festival
- Frequency: Annual
- Venue: Shirley Clarke Franklin Park (2026–present); Pullman Yards (2024–2025); SweetWater Brewery (2023); Centennial Olympic Park (2014–2022); Candler Park (2007–2013); Oakhurst (2005–2006)
- Locations: Atlanta, Georgia
- Country: United States
- Years active: 2005–present (except 2020–2021)
- Inaugurated: 2005
- Organiser: SweetWater Brewing Company & Rival Entertainment
- Website: www.sweetwater420fest.com

The SweetWater 420 Fest is an annual music festival presented by SweetWater Brewing Company in Atlanta, Georgia, held on the weekend closest to Earth Day. Established in 2005, the festival combines live music with environmental awareness, local artist markets, and craft beer selection. Over its history, the event has transitioned through several prominent locations across Atlanta, expanding from a local neighborhood gathering into a major regional event before scaling into more intimate, specialized park settings in the mid-2020s.

== History ==
The festival debuted in 2005 in the Oakhurst neighborhood of Decatur with roughly 3,000 attendees, featuring jam band Tea Leaf Green as the inaugural headliner. Seeking expansion, the festival relocated to Little Five Points' Candler Park in 2007, where it remained for seven years.

For its 10th anniversary in 2014, the festival moved to Centennial Olympic Park in downtown Atlanta to accommodate larger crowds, eventually drawing more than 30,000 attendees annually at its peak. Following a two-year hiatus due to public health restrictions, the festival returned to Centennial Olympic Park in 2022.

When Centennial Olympic Park adjusted its policies regarding large-scale commercial festivals, organizers initiated a series of venue changes. The 2023 edition was held as a scaled-back event at SweetWater's primary brewery headquarters. In 2024, the festival moved to the historic industrial site Pullman Yards in Atlanta's Kirkwood neighborhood. Just weeks before the 2024 gates opened, organizers dramatically restructured the event, transitioning from a multi-stage layout to a single-stage format, removing several high-profile headliners, and refunding ticket purchases in favor of a donation-based free admission model benefiting the Waterkeeper Alliance.

The festival returned to a traditional ticketed, multi-day structure at Pullman Yards in 2025. In 2026, the event moved to Shirley Clarke Franklin Park (formerly Westside Reservoir Park) on the west side of Atlanta. The move was designed to return the festival to its open green-space roots, utilizing a hilltop overlooking downtown Atlanta while adjusting to a compact two-day (Friday–Saturday) schedule.

== Activities ==
Conceived as an Earth Day celebration, the SweetWater 420 Festival prioritizes environmental sustainability. It hosts the Planet 420 Non-Profit Village, an exhibition space dedicated to charities, non-profits, and environmental workshops. The main festival grounds also host local food trucks, a regional artist market, and dedicated craft beer tents highlighting rare and seasonal brewery releases.

The festival also features the annual SweetWater 420 Fest 5K. The USATF-certified, AJC Peachtree Road Race-qualifying course takes place on Saturday morning, with participants racing through the neighborhoods surrounding the active festival site.

== Musical acts ==
The festival features a diverse range of musical genres, historically focusing on jam bands, roots rock, Americana, hip-hop, and electronic music.

2026 festival

- Performers: Umphrey's McGee, Thievery Corporation, Chromeo, The Moss, lespecial, Cimafunk, Watchhouse, Sneezy, Bombargo, The Heavy Heavy, Little Stranger, Clay Street Unit, Kaya's Embrace

2025 festival

- Performers: The Revivalists, Marcus King, Greensky Bluegrass, Drive-By Truckers, Cypress Hill, Lettuce, Hiss Golden Messenger, Grace Bowers, Linqua Franqa, Hannah Dasher, The Dip, Andy Frasco & The U.N., Protoje, Funk You, Cassandra Lewis, Lawrence, Sammy Rae & The Friends, Sierra Hull, Emily Wolfe, The Ries Brothers, Zach Person

2024 festival

- Performers: Gov't Mule, Big Gigantic, Grace Potter, St. Paul & The Broken Bones, Larkin Poe, Andy Frasco & the U.N., Connor Clark & Blue Rhythm Revival, Trombone Shorty & Orleans Avenue, Little Stranger, Papadosio, Hedonistas

2023 festival

- Performers: Shakey Graves, Pigeons Playing Ping Pong, Ghostland Observatory, Rome & Duddy, Neal Francis, Sunsquabi, Kitchen Dwellers, The Stews, Maggie Rose, Rieside Collective, Yam Yam, Consider the Source, Khaliko, Hotel Fction, Tall Tall treets, Happy Landing, Wolf Mask

2022 festival

- Performers: Oysterhead, Trey Anastasio Band, The String Cheese Incident, Umphrey's McGee, Snoop Dogg, Gary Clark Jr., Dirty Heads, Lotus, Goose, JJ Grey & Mofro, Joe Russo's Almost Dead, Snarky Puppy

2020–2021 festivals

- The 2020 and 2021 editions of the festival were canceled due to public health restrictions and safety concerns surrounding the COVID-19 pandemic.

2019 festival

- Performers: Widespread Panic, Joe Russo's Almost Dead, The Avett Brothers, JJ Grey & Mofro, Jason Isbell, Keller Williams

2018 festival

- Performers: Joe Russo's Almost Dead, Anders Osborne, Tedeschi Trucks Band, Vulfpeck, The Record Company, The String Cheese Incident, The Motet, Umphrey's McGee

2017 festival

- Performers: Widespread Panic, Trey Anastasio Band, moe., Anders Osborne, Twiddle, Slightly Stoopid, the Dirty Heads

2016 festival

- Performers: Kid Rock, Ben Harper and the Innocent Criminals, Bastille, Ludacris, Disco Biscuits, Cypress Hill, The Roots, North Mississippi Allstars, Maceo Parker

2015 festival

- Performers: Snoop Dogg, 311, Primus, AER, Gov't Mule, Big Data, Cage The Elephant, moe.

2014 festival

- Performers: Steel Pulse, Sublime with Rome, Chris Robinson Brotherhood, Galactic, EOTO, G. Love and Special Sauce, Wesley Cook, Dirty Dozen Brass Band

2013 festival

- Performers: George Clinton & Parliament Funkadelic, Robert Randolph & The Family Band, Ivan Neville’s Dumpstaphunk, Black Joe Lewis & the Honeybears

2012 festival

- Performers: Maceo Parker, Perpetual Groove, Donna the Buffalo, The Mickey Hart Band feat. Dave Schools, Soulive, Anders Osborne

2011 festival

- 30,000 guests
- Performers: Galactic, Railroad Earth, Arrested Development, 7 Walkers
