= Brendan Kennedy (businessman) =

American businessman

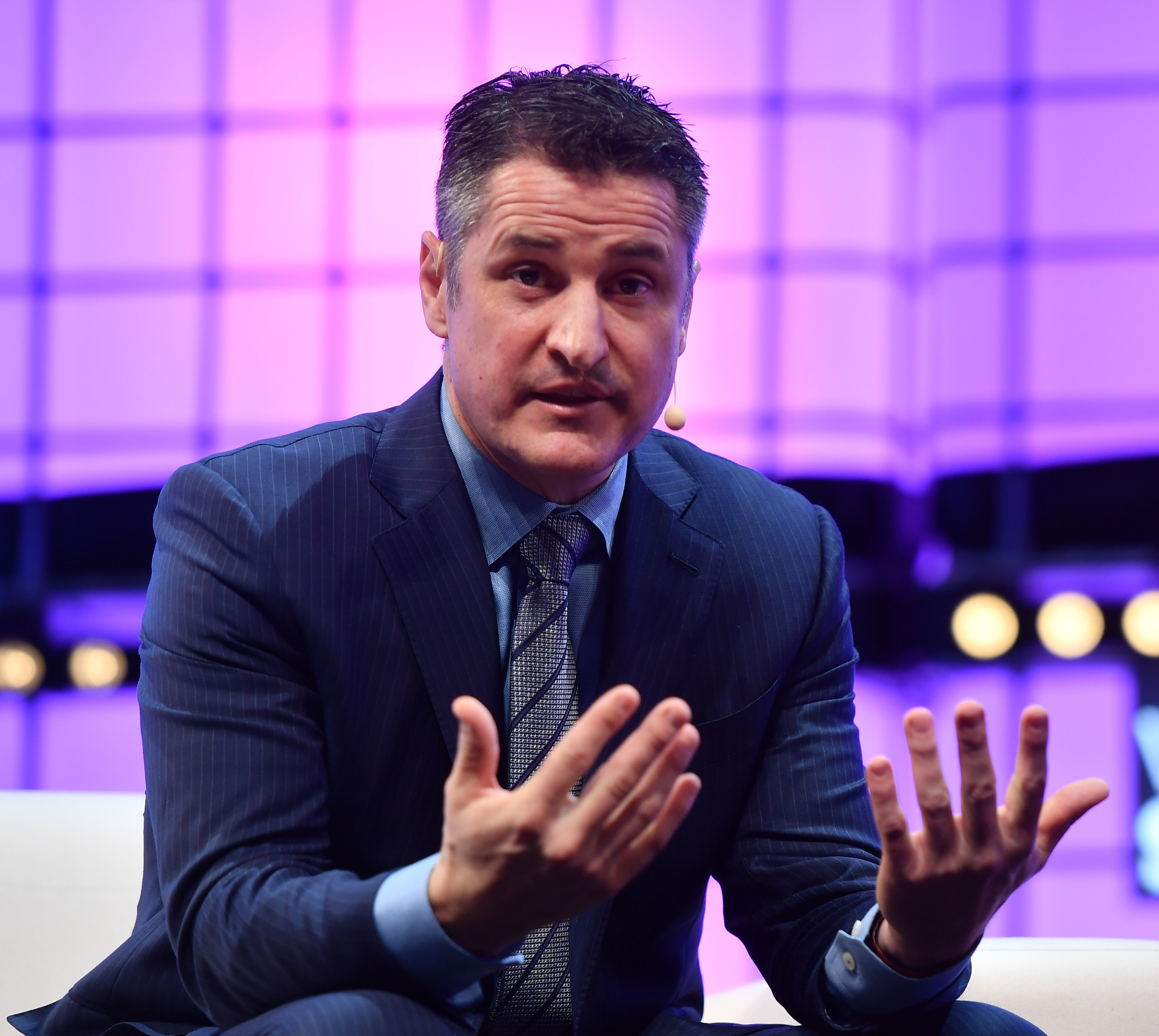
- Born: 1971 or 1972 (age 53–54)
- Education: University of California, Berkeley; University of Washington; Yale University
- Known for: CEO and co-founder, Privateer Holdings; CEO, Tilray
- Children: 2

Brendan Kennedy (born 1971 or 1972) is an American businessman, CEO and a co-founder of Privateer Holdings, along with Michael Blue and Christian Groh, and the former CEO of Tilray.

== Early life and education ==
Kennedy is the sixth of seven children of a San Francisco-based family.

Kennedy earned a BA in architecture from the University of California, Berkeley in 1993, an MS in Engineering from the University of Washington in 1995, and an MBA from Yale University in 2005.

== Career ==
Kennedy previously worked at SVB Analytics, an affiliate of Silicon Valley Bank, as did Christian Groh.

He "experimented with cannabis" before founding Privateer Holdings in 2011.

Kennedy founded Tilray in 2014, originally incorporated under Privateer Holdings and as one of Canada's first licensed producers. In 2019, Privateer Holdings was merged with Tilray.

Kennedy was Tilray's CEO until 2020, when he announced his resignation.

== Personal life ==
Kennedy has two children, and lives in Seattle. He has said that "probably the hardest thing" about becoming rich was telling his in-laws.

=== Net worth ===
According to Bloomberg L.P., as of September 2018, Kennedy has a net worth of at least US$2.4 billion. In 2019, his total compensation from Tilray was $3.48 million, down from $31.82 million in 2018. Tilray stock later collapsed and as of February 2021, Kennedy is worth $238 million.
