= Privateer Holdings =

- Industry: Private equity firm
- Founded: October 20, 2011
- Founders: Brendan Kennedy; Michael Blue; Christian Groh
- Headquarters: Seattle, Washington, United States
- Website: privateerholdings.com

Privateer Holdings is an American private equity company that invests in the legal cannabis industry. It is headquartered in Seattle, Washington and employs more than 350 people in seven countries.

Privateer Holdings secured the first institutional investor to enter the cannabis industry, Founders Fund. In 2019, Privateer Holdings was merged with Tilray.

== History ==
The company was founded by Brendan Kennedy, Michael Blue, and Chris Groh on October 20, 2011 as a private equity firm focused exclusively on the legal cannabis industry. The founders aimed to build consumer brands and professionalize the emerging sector rather than make purely passive investments in other sectors.

In 2011 the firm acquired Leafly, a then-pre-revenue cannabis strain-review and information website started by three engineers in Orange County, California. Privateer grew Leafly into a major consumer data and media platform, by the mid-2010s it was generating millions of monthly visits and advertising revenue.

== Portfolio companies ==
Privateer Holdings portfolio companies include: Leafly, Tilray, and Marley Natural, a partnership with the Bob Marley estate launching a line of cannabis-focused goods.

Privateer Holdings acquired Leafly in 2011. In 2014, Leafly became the first cannabis company to place an advertisement in the New York Times.

Privateer owns 76 percent of Tilray Inc., a company federally licensed by the Government of Canada to produce, process, package and distribute medical cannabis. The company operates a 60,000 sq. ft medical cannabis research and production facility in Nanaimo, British Columbia. As of 2016, Tilray supplied pharmaceutical-grade medical cannabis products and had raised $122 million. Tilray's primary market is Canada, where it serves more than 20,000 patients, but the company also exports medical cannabis products to other countries. Tilray was the first company to legally export medical cannabis products from North America to Australia, Brazil, Chile, the European Union, and New Zealand.

Tilray became the first medical cannabis producer in North America to be GMP certified in December 2016. GMP certification is the most rigorous standard that manufacturers of medical products must meet in their production processes. GMP certification allows Tilray to create products for clinical research. As of 2016, Tilray supplies pharmaceutical-grade medical cannabis products for three different clinical trials in partnership with hospitals and universities in Canada and Australia.

In November 2014, Privateer Holdings and Bob Marley's daughter Cedella launched the cannabis brand Marley Natural developed by the Marley family in conjunction with Privateer. Marley Natural launched its inaugural collection of cannabis products, body care, and smoking accessories in Los Angeles, California in February 2016. As of April 2017, the brand sells cannabis in California, Oregon, and Washington.
