= Groh =

Groh is a surname. Notable people with the surname include:

- Al Groh (born 1944), head coach of the University of Virginia college football team
- Christian Groh, American billionaire businessman
- David Groh (1939–2008), American film and television actor
- Heinie Groh (1889–1968), American baseball player
- Jürgen Groh (born 1956), German soccer player

== See also ==
- Great rhombihexahedron, also known as groh, a nonconvex uniform polyhedron
