= Leafly =

American cannabis website

- Logo since 2019
- Type: Public
- Traded as: OTC Pink: LFLY
- Industry: Cannabis
- Founded: June 13, 2010 in Irvine, California, U.S.
- Founders: Cy Scott; Scott Vickers; Brian Wansolich
- Headquarters: Seattle, Washington, U.S.
- Key people: Yoko Miyashita (CEO)
- Website: www.leafly.com

Leafly is an American website and online marketplace focused on cannabis. It provides information on cannabis strains, products and retailers, along with news, reviews and educational content.

Founded in 2010, the company is headquartered in Seattle, Washington. It was acquired by the cannabis-focused private-equity firm Privateer Holdings in 2011 and became a publicly traded company in February 2022 through a SPAC merger. It was delisted from the Nasdaq in January 2025 and its shares moved to the over-the-counter market.

== History ==
Leafly was founded in June 2010 by Scott Vickers, Brian Wansolich and Cy Scott. The three Orange County web developers built the site as a side project, intending it as a strain-information resource. Privateer Holdings acquired the company in 2011, after which Brendan Kennedy became chief executive. The founders later left to start the cannabis analytics company Headset.

By July 2011, the website was reported to have about 180,000 unique visitors and to be growing roughly 30 percent per month, and by April 2012 it reported about 2.3 million monthly visits and around 50,000 mobile app downloads per month. In 2016 the company said its website and mobile applications drew more than six million monthly visitors. On August 2, 2014, Leafly ran a full-page advertisement in The New York Times, described in press coverage as the first such cannabis-company advertisement in the newspaper.

== Going public and delisting ==
In August 2021 Leafly announced plans to go public through a merger with Merida Merger Corp. I, a SPAC sponsored by Merida Capital Holdings. The transaction closed on February 4, 2022, and the company's stock began trading on the Nasdaq under the ticker symbol LFLY on February 7, 2022.

The company subsequently faced financial pressure as cannabis advertisers reduced spending. It cut about 21 percent of its workforce in October 2022 and a further 21 percent in early 2023. In January 2025 the Nasdaq moved to delist the company for failing to meet minimum continued-listing requirements; trading on the exchange was suspended on January 17, 2025, and the shares transitioned to the OTC Pink market under the symbols LFLY and LFLYW.

== Leadership ==
Under Privateer Holdings, Brendan Kennedy was chief executive. On November 6, 2017, the firm appointed Chris Jeffery, a co-founder of the food-delivery service OrderUp, as CEO. He was removed in 2018.

On March 4, 2019, the company named Tim Leslie, a former vice-president at Amazon Prime Video International, as CEO. He was succeeded on August 18, 2020, by Yoko Miyashita, previously the company's general counsel.

== Business model ==
Leafly generates revenue by selling online display advertising and priority dispensary listing packages to companies in the cannabis industry. Display advertising campaigns are sold on a Cost Per Impression model. More than 4.5 million orders are placed with businesses on Leafly each year, generating $460 million in gross merchandise value (GMV) annually for Leafly partnered retailers.

== Features ==
=== Strain explorer ===
Patients and consumers use Leafly to search for cannabis strains according to medical use, such as anxiety or nausea, and desired effects, like euphoria or creativity. Relevant strains are then presented in a format similar to the periodic table. The table is color coded to identify whether the strain is sativa, indica, or a hybrid of both. The problem is that almost every piece of strain data is incorrect and unverified.

=== Dispensary locator ===
Patients can use their zip codes or city and state names to search for dispensaries, which are then displayed on a map of the area. The dispensary profiles include menus, reviews, photos, and store locations.

=== Reviews ===
Leafly users can write reviews of strains and products they have tried or dispensaries they have visited. For dispensaries and products, reviews consist of a brief comment section and a star rating system that is based on medication, service, and atmosphere. Strain reviews include desirable effects, attributes, and summary information.

== Mobile access ==
Leafly has mobile applications for iOS and Android devices. In 2021, the company launched a new iOS app that enables iPhone and iPad users to place pickup orders for cannabis in legal state markets.

== Statistics ==
- 220 million annual sessions
- 10+ million monthly active users
- 5,000+ strains in the Leafly database, sorted alphabetically and categorized by indica, sativa, and hybrid
- 1.5 million product reviews
- 9,000+ cannabis articles and resources
- 4,500+ retailers online with Leafly
- 8,000+ brands online with Leafly
- 4.5 million orders placed annually
- $460 million GMV
