= Ice beer =

Beer style

- Alcohol by volume: 5.5-12%
- Original gravity: 1.061

Ice beer is a beer that has undergone some degree of freezing during production. These beers generally have a higher alcohol content, and lower price relative to it.

The process of "icing" beer involves lowering the temperature until ice crystals form. Since ethanol has a much lower freezing point (-114 °C; -173.2 °F) than water (0 °C; 32 °F), when the ice is removed the alcohol concentration of the beer increases. The process is known as fractional freezing or freeze distillation (though it differs from true distillation).

== History ==
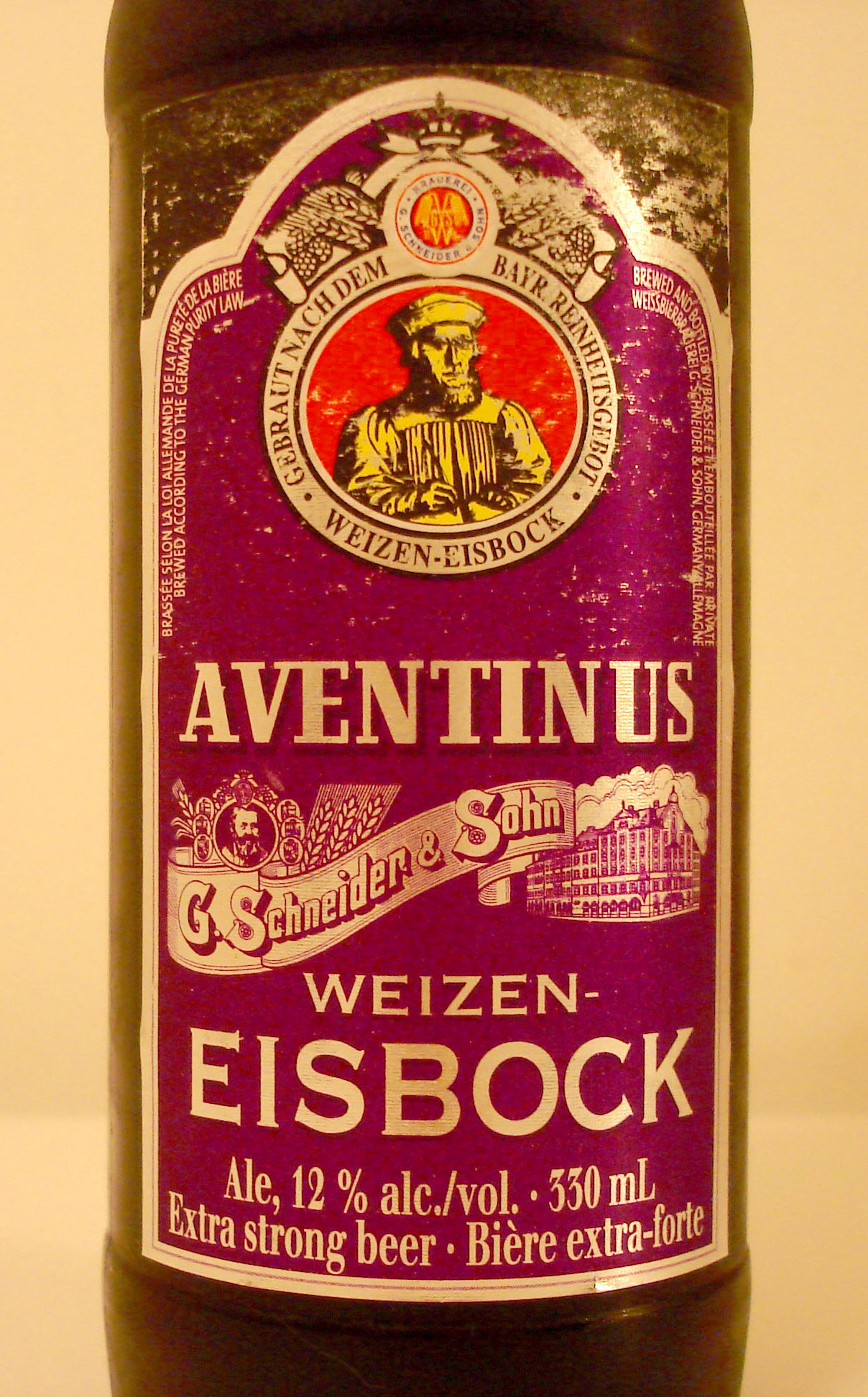
Eisbock beer (12% alcohol) created via freeze distillation of doppelbock beer. Barrels of beer were originally left outdoors to partially freeze, then the ice removed.

Ice beer was developed by brewing a strong, dark lager, then freezing the beer and removing some of the ice. This concentrates the aroma and taste of the beer, and also raises the alcoholic strength of the finished beer. This produces a beer with 12 to 15 per cent alcohol. In North America, water would be added to lower the alcohol level.

Eisbock was introduced to Canada in 1989 by the microbrewery Niagara Falls Brewing Company. The brewers started with a strong dark lager (15.3 degrees Plato/1.061 original gravity, 6% alcohol by volume), then used the traditional method of freezing and removing ice to concentrate aroma and flavours while increasing the alcoholic strength to 8% ABV. Niagara Falls Eisbock was released annually as a seasonal winter beer; each year the label would feature a different historic view of nearby Niagara Falls in winter. This continued each year until the company was sold in 1994.

Despite this precedent, the large Canadian brewer Molson (now part of Molson Coors) claimed to have made the first ice beer in North America when it introduced Canadian Ice in April 1993. However, Molson's main competitor in Canada, Labatt (now part of Anheuser-Busch InBev), claimed to have patented the ice beer process earlier. When Labatt introduced an ice beer in August 1993, capturing a 10% market share in Canada, this instigated the so-called "Ice Beer Wars" of the 1990s.

Labatt had patented a specific method for making ice beer in 1997, 1998 and 2000, "A process for chill-treating, which is exemplified by a process for preparing a fermented malt beverage wherein brewing materials are mashed with water and the resulting mash is heated and wort separated therefrom. The wort is boiled cooled and fermented, and the beer is subjected to a finishing stage, which includes aging, to produce the final beverage. The improvement comprises subjecting the beer to a cold stage comprising rapidly cooling the beer to a temperature of about its freezing point in such a manner that ice crystals are formed therein in only minimal amounts. The resulting cooled beer is then mixed for a short period of time with a beer slurry containing ice crystals, without any appreciable collateral increase in the amount of ice crystals in the resulting mixture. Finally, the so-treated beer is extracted from the mixture."

Miller acquired the U.S. marketing and distribution rights to Molson's products, and first introduced the Molson product in the United States in August 1993 as Molson Ice. Miller also introduced the Icehouse brand under the Plank Road Brewery brand name shortly thereafter, and it is still sold nationwide.

Anheuser-Busch introduced Bud Ice (5.5% ABV) in 1994, and it remains one of the country's top selling ice beers. Bud Ice has a somewhat lower alcohol content than most other ice beer brands. In 1995, Anheuser-Busch also introduced two other major brands: Busch Ice (5.9% ABV, introduced 1995) and Natural Ice (also 5.9% ABV, also introduced in 1995). Natural Ice is the No. 1 selling ice beer brand in the United States; its low price makes it very popular on college campuses all over the country.

Common ice beer brands in Canada in 2017, with approximately 5.5 to 6 per cent alcohol content, include Carling Ice, Molson's Black Ice, Busch Ice, Old Milwaukee Ice, Brick's Laker Ice and Labatt Ice. There is a Labatt Maximum Ice too, with 7.1 per cent alcohol.

== Characteristics and regulation ==
Ice beers are typically known for their high alcohol-to-price ratio. In some areas, a substantial number of ice beer products are considered to often be bought by "street drunks," and are prohibited for sale. For example, most of the products that are explicitly listed as prohibited in the beer and malt liquor category in the Seattle area are ice beers.

== See also ==
- Applejack (drink)
