= Craft Brew Alliance =

Beer brewing company

Craft Brew Alliance, Inc.
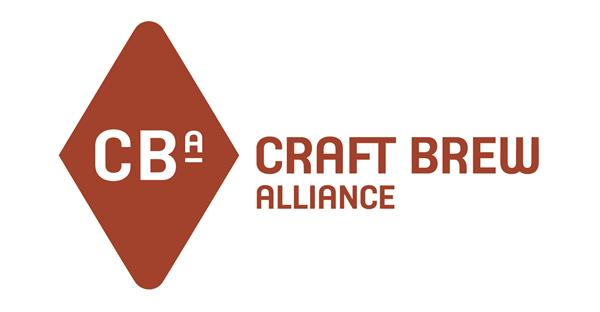
- Type: Public
- Traded as: Nasdaq: BREW
- Industry: Alcoholic beverage
- Founded: July 1, 2008; 18 years ago
- Defunct: November 11, 2019; 6 years ago
- Fate: Acquired by Anheuser-Busch InBev, becoming the Brewers Collective
- Headquarters: Portland, Oregon
- Products: Beer, cider
- Production output: 86,553,060 liters (724,900 barrels)
- Website: craftbrew.com

Craft Brew Alliance, Inc. was a beer brewing company that originally was composed of five beer and cider brands: Redhook Ale Brewery, Widmer Brothers Brewery, Kona Brewing Company, Omission Beer, and Square Mile Cider.

Craft Brew describes Kona and Omission as national brands, while the others are regional brands. In addition, Craft Brew launched strategic brewing and distribution partnerships with three other regional companies, whom it acquired outright on October 10, 2018: Appalachian Mountain Brewery, Cisco Brewing, Inc., and Wynwood Brewing.

According to the Brewers Association, Craft Brew is the ninth largest beer brewing company in the United States, based on 2015 sales volume of 824,400 and an annual working capacity of approximately 1,075,000 barrels.

As of November 2019, Anheuser-Busch InBev agreed to fully acquire Craft Brew Alliance in 2020. The acquisition started in December 2010, when AB InBev bought 32.2% of the business, became the company's distribution partner, was given two seats on its board of directors, and gained special status in the company's board committees. On August 23, 2019, AB InBev paid Craft Brew $20 million instead of exercising a "pay-or-play" option to buy out the rest of Craft Brew Alliance at a price of $24.50 a share (which would have cost about $328 million). As a consequence, shares of Craft Brew dropped more than 20% that day. However, on November 11, 2019, A-B agreed to purchase the rest of Craft Brew for $16.50 a share (about $220 million).

== History ==
The company was formed on July 1, 2008, with the merger of Redhook Ale Brewery and Widmer Brothers Brewery. CBA acquired Kona Brewing Company on October 1, 2010. In 2012, CBA launched a new brand called Omission Beer, promoting the beer as specially crafted to remove gluten. In 2013, CBA launched a cider – Square Mile Cider, and in 2014 entered into a partnership with The Chive to create KCCO beer under the independent/Chive-owned Resignation Brewery moniker.

The company was originally named Craft Brewers Alliance, but changed its name to Craft Brew Alliance on January 12, 2012.

As of March 15, 2012, Craft Brew Alliance is publicly traded as Nasdaq: BREW. Prior to this date it was publicly traded as HOOK.

== Products ==
The company produces brands such as Redhook, Widmer Brothers Brewing, Omission Beer and several others.

=== Redhook ===
Redhook was founded in the early 1980s in Seattle. At first, the brewery was a small shop in the Seattle neighborhood of Ballard. The beers brewed by Redhook include ESB, IPA, Pilsner, Copperhook, and seasonal brews. Anheuser-Busch sold Redhook to Tilray on 8 August 2023 due to the decline in sales from the 2023 Bud Light boycott.

=== Widmer Brothers Brewing ===
Widmer Brothers brews various beers including their flagship, Hefe American Hefewiezen, Drop Top Amber Ale, Upheaval IPA, Steel Bridge Porter, PDX Pils, various seasonals and 10+ small batch beers on tap at the Brewery on Russell St. Anheuser-Busch sold Widmer Brothers to Tilray on August 8, 2023, due to the decline in sales from the 2023 Bud Light boycott.

=== Kona Brewing Company ===
The Kona Brewing Company was founded in the spring of 1994 and is Hawaii's largest brewery.

=== Omission Beer ===
The company's Omission Beer is designed to have low gluten content by using a proprietary enzyme to remove gluten from traditional beer ingredients – namely malted barley.

=== Square Mile Cider Company ===
Launched in 2013, there are two primary products under this brand – "The Original" which is a traditional hard apple cider; and "Spur & Vine", which is a "hopped apple cider".

=== Appalachian Mountain Brewery ===
On December 2, 2014, CBA entered into a strategic partnership agreement with Boone, North Carolina–based Appalachian Mountain Brewery (AMB). As part of the partnership, CBA acted as "master distributor" for AMB, allowing their products to ship via the Anheuser-Busch InBev distributor network. CBA had taken an undisclosed, minority stake in AMB. On October 10, 2018, CBA announced that it acquired 100% of the AMB brand, brewery, and pub. The transaction closed November 29, 2018. On June 3, 2023, the former owners of the Appalachian Mountain Brewery announced they had purchased the company back from AB InBev and will be severing ties with the company to refocus on local distribution.

=== Cisco Brewers, Inc. ===
On September 25, 2015, CBA announced a strategic partnership agreement with Nantucket-based Cisco Brewers. As with previous partner, AMB, CBA acted as "master distributor" for AMB, allowing their products to ship via the Anheuser-Busch InBev distributor network. CBA had taken an undisclosed, minority stake in Cisco Brewers. On October 10, 2018, CBA announced that it had acquired 100% of the Cisco intellectual property assets related to its malt beverage products; Cisco's founders continue to own and operate the Cisco Brewers brewpub properties and retail merchandising, including the original brewery and grounds in Nantucket.

=== Wynwood Brewing Co. ===
On December 15, 2016, CBA announced a strategic partnership agreement with Miami, Florida–based Wynwood Brewing Co. ("Wynwood"). CBA took a 24.5% stake in Wynwood, valuing the deal at under $30 Million. As with previous partners AMB and Cisco Brewers, CBA acted as "master distributor" for Wynwood, allowing their products to ship via the Anheuser-Busch InBev distributor network. On October 10, 2018, CBA announced that it had acquired the remaining 75.5% of equity in Wynwood, making Wynwood a wholly owned subsidiary of CBA, although Wynwood co-founders Luis Brignoni and his father “Pops” Brignoni would continue to run the operations.

== Sustainability initiatives ==
Through investments in renewable energy, closed-loop systems, and energy intensity, the company is improving their operations and efficiency. The company utilizes BMS software at their breweries to access real-time tracking of key performance indicators to help reach sustainability targets.

== Officers and directors ==
Name	Title
Kurt R. Widmer	Chairman emeritus
Andrew J. Thomas	Chief executive officer
Christine Perich	Chief financial officer, treasurer
Scott Mennen	Chief operating officer
Dan Partelow	VP, commercial development
Peter Schauf	VP, international sales
Derek Hahm	VP, sales & brewpubs
Ken Kunze	Chief marketing officer

On November 21, 2013, the company announced that, effective January 1, 2014, Andy Thomas will take over as the company's new CEO.

On May 20, 2015, CBA announced the appointment of Joe Vandersteldt to CFO, along with several other changes at the executive leadership level.

== Use of the term "craft brew" ==
While the company name contains the phrase "craft brew", it does not meet the definition of a craft brewer according to the Brewers Association, due to the percentage stake owned by Anheuser-Busch InBev. The Brewers Association defines American craft brewers as "small, independent and traditional", with 'small' defined as an "annual production of 6 million barrels of beer or less", a limit changed in 2011 from 2 million to 6 million to ensure the ongoing inclusion of Boston Beer Company (the producer of the Samuel Adams brand), "independent" defined as at least 75% owned or controlled by a craft brewer, and "traditional" defined as at least 50% of its volume being all malt beer.

== See also ==
- Brewing in Oregon
