= Fordham & Dominion Brewing Company =

- Location: Dover, Delaware; United States
- Opened: 2007
- Annual production volume: 27,000 US beer barrels (32,000 hL) (2006)

Active beers
Name	Type
Dominion Double D	Imperial IPA
Dominion Candi	Belgian Tripel
Dominion Oak Barrel Stout	Stout
Dominion Hop Lips	American IPA
Dominion Morning Glory	Espresso Stout
Fordham Route 1	Session IPA
Fordham Gypsy Lager	Lager
Fordham Copperhead Ale	Red Ale
Fordham Rams Head IPA	IPA

Seasonal beers
Name	Type
Dominion Octoberfest	Marzen
Dominion Cherry Blossom Lager	Fruit Beer, Blonde Ale
Dominion GPA	Grapefruit Pale Ale
Dominion Gigi's Farmhouse Ale	Saison
Dominion Millennium	Barleywine
Dominion Black IPL	India Pale Lager
Fordham Wisteria Wheat	Hefeweizen
Fordham Spiced Harvest Ale	Spiced Ale
Fordham Rosie Parks	Oyster Stout
Fordham Doppelbock	Doppelbock

Fordham & Dominion Brewing Company, founded in 2007 in Dover, Delaware, is a brewery that produces a variety of craft beers and craft sodas.

The brewery produces two brands, the Fordham brand and the Dominion brand, under one operation. In the early 2007 the two breweries joined together as one business and by 2009 both brands were then produced together in Dover, Delaware. The brewery, as a whole, brews over 20 different styles of beer, both year-round and seasonal products. The brewery also makes specialty soda under the Dominion name, including Root Beer, Orange Cream, Black Cherry, and Ginger Ale.

== History ==
From 1996 to 2006, Old Dominion hosted an annual beer festival that showcased small brewers from around the region, as well as some breweries from around the US and Europe. The festival featured more than 50 breweries and live music. The three-day event was held each year on the last full weekend of June; management and organization of the festival was given over to Vintage 50, which now hosts the event twice a year, in June and October.

Old Dominion has been fertile ground for producing high quality brewers, such as: John Mallet at Bell's Brewery, Ron Barchet at Victory Brewing Company, Matthew Hagerman at Lost Rhino Brewing Company, Favio Garcia at Lost Rhino Brewing and Dynasty Brewing, and Kenny Allen at True Respite Brewing Company.

Bailey put Old Dominion up for sale in the mid-2000s. No serious offers to purchase the company were made until 2007, when Fordham Brewing of Annapolis, Maryland offered to purchase the company, financed in part by Anheuser-Busch (AB) for a minority stake in the two breweries, to form Coastal Brewing Company. The majority of Coastal is owned by Fordham Brewing Company, owned by Bill Muhlhauser (owner of both Fordham and the Ram's Head Taverns of Maryland) and other partners. Anheuser-Busch's purchase stake gave them no control of either of the two breweries, nor any input or influence on brewery recipes, nor oversight of any day-to-day management. The brewery also owns its own distribution rights.

In May 2009 all brewing operations, combined with those of Fordham Brewing, were moved to a new facility in Dover, Delaware. The current core brands of the brewery continue to sell briskly in both the on-site and packaging ends, and can be found as the "house" brews at many locations throughout the DC Metro area, including the Great American Restaurant chain (except for the Sweetwater Tavern in Centreville, Virginia), Capital One Arena, and Nationals Park. Old Dominion continues to host various brew sampling and cask events throughout the DC-MD-VA-DE-NJ-PA metropolitan area, maintaining their status as a Mid-Atlantic regional brewer, and their Oak Barrel Stout and Pinup Series brands remain popular sellers in the packaging end of the line, available at several retail and grocery chains, bars and retailers in their regions.

As of January 2011, Jim Lutz (former VP of sales and marketing at Flying Dog Brewery of Frederick, MD), took over as the new President and CEO of Coastal Brewing.

== Beer selection ==
=== Lagers ===
- Fordham Gypsy Lager 5.0%

=== Ales ===
- Dominion Double D Double IPA 9.0%
- Dominion Oak Barrel Stout 5.5%
- Dominion Hop Lips IPA 6.0%
- Dominion Candi Belgian Tripel 10.0%
- Dominion Morning Glory Espresso Stout 9.0%
- Fordham Route 1 Session IPA 4.5%
- Fordham Copperhead Ale 5.0%
- Fordham Rams Head IPA 7.5%

=== Specialty/seasonal ===
Seasonal beers include:

- Dominion Octoberfest (August) 5.6%
- Dominion Cherry Blossom Lager (March) 5.2%
- Dominion Gigi's Farmhouse Ale (June) 7.2%
- Dominion GPA Grapefruit Pale Ale (June) 6%
- Dominion Millennium Barleywine (November) 11%
- Dominion Black IPL (January) 5%
- Fordham Wisteria Wheat (May) 5%
- Fordham Spiced Harvest Ale (August) 6.5%
- Fordham Rosie Parks Oyster Stout (September) 5%
- Fordham Doppelbock (December) 8%
