= Budweiser American Ale =

Amber ale

Budweiser American Ale was an American-style amber ale produced by Anheuser-Busch under its Budweiser brand. Introduced in September 2008, and discontinued in 2011, American Ale was meant to appeal to beer enthusiasts who were looking for a more complex flavor than the popular Budweiser lager.

It had 5.3% alcohol by volume and was widely available across the United States. A 3.2% alcohol by weight version was available in select states as determined by local laws.

== Ingredients ==
Budweiser American Ale is an all-malt brew made with caramel malted barley from Idaho and Minnesota, then dry-hopped with Cascade hops from the Pacific Northwest. In addition to using only American ingredients, the beer is also brewed domestically.

== Flavor and Appearance ==
The ale is often described as amber or copper in color and has sweet, malty and citrus flavors. It is generally described as having a medium-bodied taste with a hoppy finish. Recommended serving temperature is 45°F (7°C).
