= Christian Groh =

American businessman

- Education: California Maritime Academy; San Francisco State University
- Known for: Co-founder, Privateer Holdings

Christian Groh is an American businessman, and one of the co-founders of Privateer Holdings, along with Brendan Kennedy and Michael Blue.

== Early life ==
Groh earned a bachelor's degree from California Maritime Academy, and an MBA from San Francisco State University.

== Career ==
Groh previously worked at SVB Analytics, an affiliate of Silicon Valley Bank, as did Brendan Kennedy.
