= Redhook Ale Brewery =

American brewery

- Interactive map of Redhook Ale Brewery
- Location: 714 E Pike Street; Seattle, Washington, U.S.
- Coordinates: 47°36′51.8″N 122°19′21.8″W
- Opened: 1981; 45 years ago
- Annual production volume: 216,900 US beer barrels (254,500 hL) in 2013
- Owner: Tilray
- Website: www.redhook.com

Active beers
Name	Type
Redhook ESB	Extra Special Bitter
Long Hammer IPA	India Pale Ale
Big Ballard Imperial IPA (West Coast)	Imperial IPA
Bicoastal IPA	India Pale Ale

Seasonal beers
Name	Type
Tangelic Halo Tangerine IPA (Summer)	India Pale Ale
My Oh My Caramel Macchiato Milk Stout (Spring)	Milk Stout
Winterhook (Winter)	Winter Warmer

The Redhook Ale Brewery is a beer brewery operating out of Seattle, Washington, United States. It was founded in Seattle in 1981 by Paul Shipman and Gordon Bowker, and is currently owned by Tilray. Its flagship brewery, the Redhook Brewlab, was located in the in fremont district, then moved to Pike Motorworks building in Seattle's Capitol Hill neighborhood. Redhook also operated a location in Portsmouth, New Hampshire, from the 1990s until June 2018, when it was rebranded under Cisco Brewers from Nantucket, Massachusetts.

== Beers ==
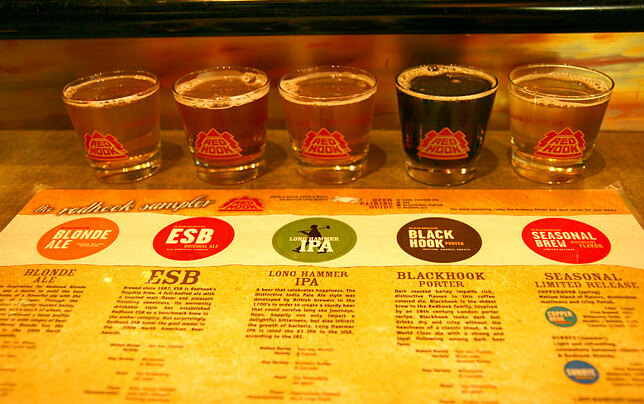
Samples of Redhook beers in 2008

Redhook currently produces several styles of beer marketed under distinct brand names. The brewery's flagship brand is Redhook ESB (5.8% ABV); its other beers include Long Hammer IPA (6.2% ABV), Big Ballard Imperial IPA (8.6% ABV), Bicoastal IPA (7.1% ABV), and also various seasonal offerings: My Oh My Caramel Macchiato Milk Stout (Spring - 5.5% ABV), Tangelic Halo Tangerine IPA (Summer - 6.2% ABV), Winterhook (Fall/Winter - ABV varies year to year).

Redhook distributes its products through a network of wholesale distributors, Craft Brew Alliance Inc, and a distribution agreement with Anheuser-Busch InBev, Incorporated (which owns Craft Brew Alliance). As of March 2008, the brewery distributed its products in 48 U.S. states. Anheuser-Busch sold Redhook Ale Brewery to Tilray on 8 August, 2023.
