= Tilray =

North American pharmaceuticals, brewing and cannabis company

Tilray Brands, Inc.
- Type: Public
- Traded as: Nasdaq: TLRY; TSX: TLRY
- Industry: Cannabis, Pharmaceuticals, Brewing
- Founded: 2013; 13 years ago
- Founder: Brendan Kennedy
- Headquarters: New York City, United States
- Key people: Irwin D. Simon (CEO)
- Revenue: ▲US$789 million (2024)
- Net income: ▲US$-222 million (2024)
- Number of employees: 1,600 (2023)
- Website: tilray.com

Tilray Brands, Inc. is an American pharmaceutical, cannabis-lifestyle and consumer packaged goods company, incorporated in the United States, headquartered in New York City. Tilray also has operations in Canada, Australia, New Zealand,Latin America, with growing facilities in Germany, Portugal and the United Kingdom.

In December 2020, the company announced a merger with Aphria, and now operates under the Tilray name and its ticker symbol on NASDAQ and the Toronto Stock Exchange.

Tilray also owns several breweries and was ranked by the Brewers Association as the 4th largest craft beer company in the US in 2025.

== History ==
Founded in 2013, Tilray was originally incorporated under the umbrella of Seattle-based Privateer Holdings and was one of Canada's first licensed producers. At the end of 2014, it secured the first institutional investment in the cannabis industry from Founders Fund, a San Francisco-based venture capital fund. In 2016, it became the first cannabis company to conduct a clinical trial approved by Health Canada. The trial evaluated the therapeutic potential of medical cannabis. In January 2017, Tilray was certified for good manufacturing practices.

By October 2018, the company had raised $1.1 billion. In July 2018, it became the first cannabis company to trade publicly on a major U.S. stock exchange, opening on the NASDAQ exchange at a price of $17 per share, which increased in September 2018 to $214 per share, and then descended to $29 per share by August 2019. The IPO raised US$153 million.

In September 2018, Tilray became the first Canadian cannabis company to legally export medical cannabis to the U.S. for a clinical trial. In December 2018, the company signed a deal with Novartis subsidiary Sandoz to sell, distribute and co-brand Tilray's non-smokeable/non-combustible medical cannabis products in legal markets worldwide. On June 19, 2018, Tilray announced the launch of High Park Company which operates in the adult recreational cannabis market to establish unique adult-use brands in Canada.

Since September 2022, Tilray has been licensed by the Polish and Italian Ministries of Health to import and distribute THC25 medical cannabis throughout Poland and Italy.

In August 2023, Tilray acquired eight beverage brands in addition to the breweries of the brands from Anheuser-Busch for $85 million.

== Strategic partnerships and acquisitions ==
In 2018, Tilray announced it had entered into global alliance with Sandoz, a division of Novartis to co-brand and distribute non-combustible medical cannabis products in global markets where it is legally authorized. The Globe and Mail dubbed this partnership as ‘big-pharma’s first foray into cannabis’.

Also in 2018, Tilray announced a $100-million joint venture with the world's largest brewer, AB InBev to research non-alcohol tetrahydrocannabinol (THC) and cannabidiol (CBD)-infused beverages, through their respective subsidiaries, Labatt Breweries and High Park Company.

In 2019, Tilray signed a $250 million revenue-sharing deal with U.S. based brand company, Authentic Brands Group, to leverage ABG brand names, such as Juicy Couture, Greg Norman, and Nine West to create cannabis products. ABG has a portfolio of over 50 brands.

In February 2019, Tilray acquired Manitoba Harvest, a hemp foods manufacturer, for $317 million from Compass Diversified Holdings. The acquisition allowed Tilray to use Manitoba Harvest's retail distribution network to enter the U.S. CBD market. Manitoba Harvest's products are available in approximately 13,000 U.S. stores and 3,600 in Canada.

Also in 2019, Tilray entered into an agreement with Natura Naturals Holdings which owns 155,000 square feet of licensed cultivation greenhouses in Leamington, Ontario. The acquisition doubled the cultivation ability of the company in Canada. In May 2020, Tilray announced closure of the High Park Gardens site (previously Natura Naturals) for cost reductions.

In July 2019, Tilray acquired U.K.-based Smith & Sinclair to develop CBD-infused edibles. In August 2019, Tilray acquired Alberta cannabis retailer, Four20.

On April 10, 2023, Tilray announced an agreement to acquire Hexo Corp. for approximately US$56 million. Hexo shareholders will receive 0.4352 of a share of Tilray common stock in exchange for each share held.

On March 2 2026, Tilray announced a £33m ($44.5 million) deal to acquire British brewer BrewDog's global brand, intellectual property, U.K. brewing facilities, and a network of pubs across the U.K. and Ireland. The deal covers BrewDog's core identity and physical footprint in the U.K., which includes brewing operations and 11 pubs.

== Merger with Aphria ==
On 15 December 2020, Aphria conducted a reverse acquisition of Tilray, creating the largest global cannabis company by revenue and geographic reach. The chief executive officer (CEO) of Aphria, Irwin D. Simon, stated that the merger strategy was to capture Tilray's business assets and public trading exposure in the United States and its free trade abilities in Europe, enabling potential for becoming a global operation. Irwin was named as CEO and chairman of the board for the merged company, and Tilray CEO, Brendan Kennedy, will be a member of the board of directors. The merged companies will keep Tilray's name and trade under the Tilray ticker symbol, TLRY, on the NASDAQ exchange.

By combining assets, the new Tilray company will develop craft beer and cannabis-infused beverages in partnership with Anheuser-Busch InBev, and have branded hemp and cannabidiol products. According to one source, the world market potential for cannabis products is $94 billion by 2025.

== Brewery ownership ==
Tilray also owns several breweries: Montauk Brewing Company, Good Supply Beer, 10 Barrel Brewing Company, Square Mile Cider Company, Terrapin Beer Company, Truss Beverage Co and BrewDog breweries. Tilray's beer division ranked No. 9 on the Brewers Association's annual report of the US nation's top craft companies based on beer sales volume in 2022.

=== Alpine Beer Company ===
Founded in 1999 in Alpine, California, the Alpine Beer Company produced award-winning sour beers. The company would be acquired by the Green Flash Brewing Company in 2014 and continued existence as a brand.

=== Blue Point Brewing Company ===
Founded in a former ice factory in 1998 to fill the niche of a Long Island focused Microbrewery. The company's flagship "Toasted Lager" won a gold medal at the 2006 World Beer Cup in the American-Style Amber Lager category. The company distributed their beer to 19 states and Washington D.C. before being purchased by Anheuser-Busch InBev on February 5, 2014, for nearly $24 million. Citing financial shortfall in part due to the 2023 Bud Light boycott, Anheuser-Busch sold the brand to Tilray in August 2023.

=== Breckenridge Brewery ===
Founded in Breckenridge, Colorado in 1990 as the state's third craft brewery before moving most of their production to Denver in 1992. In 2010 the company merged with the Wynkoop Brewing Company and purchased the Phantom Canyon Brewing company to become the Breckenridge-Wynkoop LLC. In 2015 they moved to a new facility in Littleton, Colorado and was producing 70,000 barrels of beer per year. On December 22, 2015, Anheuser-Busch InBev announced its intent to purchase just Breckenridge Brewery from Breckenridge-Wynkoop LLC, splitting the companies with the purchase finalizing in 2016. Anheuser-Busch sold the brand to Tilray in August 2023.

=== Green Flash Brewing Company ===
Founded in 2002 in Vista, California before moving to San Diego in 2011. The company operated a 44,000 barrel per year facility in San Diego in 2011, and a 100,000 barrel per year facility in Virginia Beach, Virginia in 2013. By 2014 their beer was being sold in all 50 states, as well as internationally and they purchased the Alpine Beer Company. The company peaked in 2016 when it was the 37th largest producer of beer in the United States, afterwards the company began a rapid decline due to the rise of rival craft beer producers. In 2018 they cut distribution internationally and to 42 states and laid off 15% of their workforce and defaulted on their loans to construct the Virginia Beach facility. The company would be sold to a group of private investors by the end of the year, who would sell the company to Tilray in 2020.

=== Redhook Ale Brewery ===
Founded in Seattle in 1981, Redhook specializes in the production of India pale ales. A founding member of the Craft Brew Alliance, the company's distribution rights were bought by Cisco Brewers in 2018. In 2019 the Craft Brew Alliance, and its properties, were acquired by Anheuser-Busch InBev with Redhook operating as a brand. Anheuser-Busch sold the brand to Tilray in August 2023.

=== Shock Top ===
A Belgian-Style, spiced Witbeer brand introduced as a seasonal beer by Anheuser-Busch in February 2006, however, the beer's popularity quickly grew and was used as a rival to Molson Coors' Blue Moon. The brand entered a decline following a failed rebranding effort in 2017 and, citing financial shortfall in part due to the 2023 Bud Light boycott, Anheuser-Busch sold the brand to Tilray in August 2023.

=== SweetWater Brewing Company ===
A craft brewery founded in 1997 by Freddy Bensch and Kevin McNerney in Atlanta, Georgia. SweetWater's beers are unpasteurized and distribution is limited to select states. SweetWater would be acquired by Aphria In November 2020 for $300 million. Later, in December 2020, Aphria merged with Tilray bringing SweetWater under Tilray's ownership.

=== Widmer Brothers Brewery ===
Founded in 1984 in Portland, Oregon, the company primarily produced Hefeweizen. In 2007 Widmer and Redhook announced that they were going to merge to form the Craft Brewers Alliance, which was renamed to the Craft Brew Alliance in 2012. The goal of which was to offer smaller regional beers a national distribution network. In 2019 Widmer and the whole of the Craft Brew Alliance was bought by Anheuser-Busch InBev, with Widmer operating as a brand. Anheuser-Busch sold the brand to Tilray in August 2023.

== Food and drink ==
=== HiBall Energy ===
HiBall Energy was founded in 2005 by Todd Berardi and was based out of San Francisco. They produced organic energy drinks and were purchased by Anheuser-Busch on July 20, 2017, in an effort to diversify into non-alcoholic beverages. Their products were low in sugar, produced with fair-trade ingredients, and were available at 14,000 locations prior to its acquisition by Anheuser-Busch. On May 19, 2023, Anheuser-Busch announced that they were discontinuing HiBall alongside their box wine brand Babe Wine, stating that they will be focusing on their "mega brands" instead. This came despite HiBall having a dedicated consumer fan-base that heavily protested the discontinuation. An Anheuser-Busch spokesmen stated that the discontinuation had nothing to do with the 2023 Bud Light boycott. Anheuser-Busch sold the HiBall brand to Tilray alongside seven of their beer brands in August 2023.

== Preliminary clinical research ==
In partnership with University of Sydney, NSW Government, Chris O'Brien Lifehouse, Tilray participated in a clinical trial testing the efficacy and tolerability of medical cannabis as a possible treatment for the side effects of chemotherapy. Led by The Hospital for Sick Children, in Toronto, Canada, Tilray provided a cannabidiol (CBD) oil product available in Canada to test the efficacy and tolerability of medical cannabis oil as a possible treatment for pediatric epilepsy (Dravet syndrome). In partnership with the University of British Columbia, Tilray provided medical cannabis products used to test medical cannabis as a possible treatment for post-traumatic stress disorder. In partnership with the Grupo Español de Investigación en Neurooncología GEINO, in Spain, Tilray supplied medical cannabis products for the trial testing the efficacy and tolerability of medical cannabis as a possible treatment for glioblastoma.

In 2019, Tilray signed an agreement with Cannamedical Pharma GmbH to export $3.3 million worth of medical cannabis from its Portugal facility to Germany, marking Tilray's first export from Tilray Portugal Unipessoal, Lda. Tilray also has a research partnership with Coimbra University in Portugal.

In August 2019, Tilray announced a partnership with New York University to study the potential ability of CBD to treat alcohol use disorder and post-traumatic stress disorder. In partnership with New York University, Tilray supplied CBD for a clinical trial studying its possible efficacy for treating disorders caused by breast cancer treatments.

== See also ==
- List of cannabis companies
- List of largest cannabis companies by revenue
