= OEG Inc. =

Company in Alberta, Canada

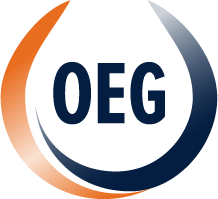
- Formerly: Rexall Sports Corporation (2008–2014)
- Type: Subsidiary
- Industry: Sports & Entertainment
- Founded: 2008; 18 years ago (as Rexall Sports Corporation); 2014; 12 years ago (reorganized as Oilers Entertainment Group)
- Headquarters: Edmonton, Alberta, Canada
- Key people: Daryl Katz (Founder/Governor); Jürgen Schreiber (CEO of B.O./A. Gov.); Jeff Jackson (CEO/Pres. of H.O.); Stan Bowman (EVP of H.O./GM); Bob Nicholson (A. Gov.)
- Owner: Daryl Katz
- Parent: Katz Group of Companies
- Subsidiaries: Edmonton Oilers (NHL); Edmonton Oil Kings (WHL); Bakersfield Condors (AHL); Oil Country Championship (PGA Tour Canada); Tokyo Smoke; Dark Castle Entertainment
- Website: www.oeg.ca

OEG Inc. (formerly Oilers Entertainment Group) is a company based out of Edmonton, Alberta, that operates Katz Group of Companies' sports and entertainment offerings. The flagship property and namesake is the Edmonton Oilers of the National Hockey League. OEG also operates Rogers Place, the new home of the Oilers in downtown Edmonton. OEG is owned by Daryl Katz.

== History ==
When Daryl Katz bought the Oilers in 2008 from Edmonton Investors Group, he created Rexall Sports Corporation as an umbrella for Katz Group's sports and entertainment interests.

The company was reorganized as Oilers Entertainment Group in 2014, with former Hockey Canada president Bob Nicholson as vice chairman. In 2015, he became chief executive officer and operating head of Katz' entertainment interests, including the Oilers.

On April 24, 2015 OEG announced the appointment of Peter Chiarelli as president of hockey operations and general manager of the Oilers.

OEG's CEO, Jürgen Schreiber, is currently under investigation by the Canada Revenue Agency after an audit found millions in undeclared Canadian income from real estate holdings and incorporated businesses. At the same time, he claimed to have lived in the Bahamas between 2016 and 2019.

== Operations ==
Originally beginning with just the Oilers, OEG has grown to include a significant sports and entertainment offerings portfolio. OEG now owns and operates the Edmonton Oil Kings of the Western Hockey League and the Bakersfield Condors of the American Hockey League. From January 2014 to September 2016, OEG owned the Bakersfield Condors/Norfolk Admirals franchise in the ECHL. OEG also owns Aquila Productions, which produces film & television, live events and broadcasts, and corporate and branded messaging services.

OEG also operates Rogers Place, a multi-use indoor arena that is home to the Edmonton Oilers and the Edmonton Oil Kings. In addition to sporting events, the arena plays host to concerts and other events in the Ice District, a mixed-use sports and entertainment development, featuring a winter garden - a key part of the architectural design used as a large multi-use indoor public space - and an adjoining community rink which is open to the public.

In April 2015, Katz announced a partnership with film producer Joel Silver to take control over Silver Pictures Entertainment – a company that develops, produces and provides and/or arranges financing for feature films, television and digital projects. Moreover, OEG owns Dark Castle Entertainment, another content production company under the OEG umbrella. In 2019, Joel Silver was freed from his involvement in Silver Pictures Entertainment. Following legal disputes have been settled swiftly, with Silver leaving all the rights to all existing projects and development responsibilities to OEG.

In 2022, OEG acquired the Tokyo Smoke brand and 23 retail cannabis stores from Canopy Growth.

On the first of August 2023, Jeff Jackson was appointed as chief executive officer (CEO) of hockey operations. Jeff Jackson works closely with K. Holland to manage everything related to OEG's NHL, AHL and WHL business. Jackson previously worked for the "powerful and respected" full-service agency Wasserman. He reports directly to Daryl Katz.

== See also ==
- Daryl Katz
- Katz Group of Companies
- Edmonton Oilers
- Rogers Place
- Ice District
