= Wikileaf =

American cannabis industry information site

- Company type: Public
- Traded as: CSE: WIKI
- Industry: Cannabis consumer information
- Founded: January 22, 2014
- Founder: Dan Nelson
- Headquarters: Seattle, Washington
- Parent: Nesta Holding Co.

Wikileaf Technologies is a Seattle business providing data services to the cannabis industry and information to consumers. The company provides price indexes and cannabis strain reviews and information.

== Background ==
Wikileaf was founded in Seattle's South Lake Union area in 2014 by Dan Nelson, some months before adult use legalization in Washington state under Initiative 502. That Spring, it was also featured as one of Entrepreneur Magazine's Most Brilliant Business Ideas of 2014. By 2016, with seven employees, it was acquired by Nesta, a Canadian fund. The company provides an online resource for medical and recreational marijuana patients and consumers where users can compare marijuana dispensary prices and menus as well as research cannabis strains. Wikileaf displays menus and prices for recreational and medical dispensaries in eleven states. The company has been dubbed "The Priceline of Pot" although their price comparison model is a "reverse auction". Users specify how much they are going to spend on their next marijuana dispensary visit and, then, all the marijuana dispensaries within his/her radius put forth the most amount (in grams) they can at this price point.

Wikileaf was acquired by Nesta Holding Co. Ltd. on May 2, 2016 for an undisclosed sum. Nesta is private equity firm located in Ottawa, Canada working with partnerships and brands within the cannabis community. It was founded in 2015 by Chuck Rifici, co-founder and former CEO of Canopy Growth Corporation (formerly Tweed Marijuana Inc.).

In 2017, Wikileaf launched the first in-flight cannabis commercial to Virgin America. In 2018, the company cracked down on illegal dispensaries on their platform.

In 2019, Wikileaf raised $6.8 million in funding and announced their plans to open satellite offices in markets with high dispensary densities as well as newly legal states. Through a reverse takeover of an existing Canadian company, it became listed on the Canadian stock exchange in late 2019.

== Business model ==
Wikileaf is currently providing dispensaries with free menu pages to showcase their products and prices. They plan to start offering companies that want increased exposure the opportunity to do so at a cost and will also have additional geo-targeted advertising opportunities for dispensaries looking to increase their exposure beyond their menu page.

=== Use ===
Cannabis consumers can use the site in three primary ways.

- They can compare marijuana dispensary prices and menu's in their neighborhood.
- They can leave reviews of their favorite marijuana dispensaries based on quality of product, customer service and ambiance of the establishment.
- They can research cannabis strains based on recommended time of use (morning, afternoon, evening and night), Indica, Sativa or Hybrid. Once a strain is selected, an overview is provided as well as THC content, medical use, effects, and reviews.

=== Mobile usage ===
Wikileaf has launched its mobile app for Android on October 17, 2016 and for Apple on Nov 09, 2016.

== See also ==
- Leafly, a cannabis consumer information website also based in Seattle
- Weedmaps, a cannabis pricing and mapping website
