= Tokyo Smoke =

Canadian cannabis retail brand owned by OEG Inc.

- Product type: Recreational cannabis and related accessories
- Current owner: OEG Inc.
- Country: Canada
- Introduced: 2015; 11 years ago
- Markets: Manitoba; Ontario; Newfoundland and Labrador; Saskatchewan
- Previous owners: Canopy Growth
- Website: ca.tokyosmoke.com

Tokyo Smoke is a Canadian recreational cannabis retail brand owned by OEG Inc. that operates in the provinces of Manitoba, Ontario, Newfoundland and Labrador, and Saskatchewan. It was co-founded by father and son Lorne and Alan Gertner in 2015.

== History ==
Tokyo Smoke was co-founded by Lorne and Alan Gertner in 2015. Lorne Gertner had founded Canada’s first legal medical marijuana grower, Cannasat Therapeutics, in 2004. The brand’s first location, Tokyo Smoke Found, opened in April 2015 in Toronto’s West Queen West neighbourhood. In early 2017, the company acquired another cannabis company, Van der Pop, based in Seattle and is targeted towards women.

At the 2017 Canadian Cannabis awards, Tokyo Smoke won the award for "Brand of the Year."

On December 21, 2017, the company announced that it would merge with DOJA Cannabis and form a new company called Hiku Brands Company Ltd. On July 10, 2018, Canopy Growth acquired Hiku brands and absorbed its portfolio of brands.

On August 14, 2019, Acreage announced its intention to open cannabis stores under the Tokyo Smoke brand in the United States.

In November 2021, Tokyo Smoke and UberEats struck a deal for users to be able to order cannabis for pick-up through the app.

OEG Inc. acquired the Tokyo Smoke brand in 2022.

In August 2024, Tokyo Smoke filed for creditor protection under the Companies' Creditors Arrangement Act, blaming rising interest costs and fast expansion as a result of the decision. The company immediately shuttered 29 of its locations across Canada. The company exited creditor protection in December 2024.

== Retail Stores ==
Tokyo Smoke currently operates 10 cannabis dispensaries in Manitoba,, 5 in Saskatchewan, 3 in Newfoundland and 20 in Ontario. The company no longer operates its 3 coffee shops: 2 in Toronto, and 1 in Calgary. These coffee shops did not sell cannabis, instead, they sold coffee, cafe food, and cannabis accessories. In September 2018, Tokyo Smoke announced that they have received approval to build up to 10 cannabis stores in Manitoba. In Ontario, where licensed producers are restricted from owning more than 9.9 per cent of a cannabis store, Canopy Growth has entered into branding agreements with retail license owners to open stores under the Tokyo Smoke name.

== Alan Gertner ==
Alan Gertner
- Born: 1984 (age 41–42); Toronto, Ontario, Canada
- Education: MBA
- Alma mater: University of Western Ontario Ivey Business School
- Occupation: Entrepreneur
- Known for: Tokyo Smoke

Alan Gertner (born 1984) is a Canadian co-founder and CEO of Tokyo Smoke. Gertner, who also co-founded Hiku, a Canadian company, is a former Google executive known for his work in the Canadian cannabis industry. Gertner was born in Toronto, Ontario and raised in the Forest Hill neighbourhood by his parents. His father Lorne Gertner is a lifelong entrepreneur who managed a women's apparel manufacturer Mister Leonard. Alan received a degree in management and business administration from the University of Western Ontario Ivey Business School.

From 2009 to 2014, Gertner held several executive positions at Google's Mountain View, California and Google Asia Singapore offices. During this tenure, he was a founding member of Google's first Global Business Strategy team in Mountain View, California. In 2015, the company sent him to Ghana to help build an infrastructure for high-speed Internet. During this project, and while on his way to a "voodoo" ceremony in rural Ghana, Gertner had a life-changing conversation with a tour guide who told him: "You either work on something you love, or work because it supports the people you love." This encounter was a defining moment in his career that made him quit his job at Google, take a break and later start Tokyo Smoke in partnership with his father. Gertner now lives in Toronto and is mainly involved in the cannabis industry.

Gertner, a former Google employee, is currently involved in Tokyo Smoke, a retail operation and brand he co-founded in 2015 with his father Lorne Gertner. Gertner (the father) is considered the Godfather of Canadian cannabis and is also the CEO of Hill and Gertner Capital Corp., a Toronto-based merchant bank. Tokyo Smoke has a downtown Toronto coffee shop and store that sells pot paraphernalia and accessories. He is one of the handful entrepreneurs and investors who left lucrative corporate jobs in technology and finance to focus on startups in the marijuana industry. Gertner has expanded the Tokyo Smoke brand locally and internationally with eight stores.

Gertner raised $10 million in capital and led the company's merger with Cannabis Company Limited known as DOJA Cannabis in December 2017. The combined company known as Hiku Brands Company Ltd. is headed by Gertner and houses the cannabis brands of DOJA, Tokyo Smoke, and Van der Pop.
