= Jürgen Schreiber =

Jürgen Schreiber may refer to:

- Jürgen Schreiber (journalist) (1947–2022), German investigative journalist
- Jürgen Schreiber (businessman) (born 1962), German manager in international retail business
