= Brad Mitchell =

- Born: April 25, 1962 (age 64); Seneca Falls, New York, U.S.
- Education: Harvard University The Pennsylvania State University
- Occupation: Businessman
- Known for: President, Pinnacle Summit Services and The Mitchell Group
- Spouse: Julia Mitchell (m. 1990)
- Children: Two

Brad Mitchell (born April 25, 1962) is an American businessman who was the founding president and CEO of ChainDrugStore.net from 2000 to 2005. He prepared the company for a management-led buyout with a private investor in early 2006.

His public service includes serving on the White House Staff of President George H. W. Bush (41) and as a policy adviser in President Bush's 1988 Presidential campaign. Additionally, he led the presidential transition teams for the National Aeronautics and Space Administration (NASA), the White House Office of Science and Technology Policy and the National Science Foundation.

Mitchell is founder and board chairman of the National Athletic and Professional Success Academy (NAPSA); president of Pinnacle Summit Services and The Mitchell Group, a consulting and executive leadership coaching firm; and a certified executive leadership coach (PCC), International Coaching Federation (ICF) specializing in coaching successful leaders and executive teams to elevate their performance.

Mitchell previously served as president of S4 Consulting, chief commercial officer of AccuWeather Enterprise Solutions, and senior vice president and chief marketing officer of DrugEmporium.com. He holds degrees from The Pennsylvania State University and Harvard University. Mitchell is a retired lieutenant (junior grade) in the United States Naval Reserve.

== Early life and education ==
Mitchell was born in Seneca Falls, New York in 1962 and earned his B.S. in Industrial Engineering from The Pennsylvania State University and his Master's degree from Harvard University.

He went on to serve as board member on the Penn State College of Engineering Industrial and Professional Advisory Council (IPAC) and Center for Service Enterprise Engineering Advisory Board. Mitchell has taught in the portfolio of offerings from the Penn State Smeal College of Business Executive Programs. He also holds certificates related to executive coaching, e-commerce, and finance from MIT Sloan School of Management, Rice University, and Harvard University.

== Career ==
Early in his career, Mitchell worked for General Motors, Ernst & Young, and Enron Energy Services. After serving as senior vice president and chief marketing officer of DrugEmporium.com (Drug Emporium's initiative at taking its brick and mortar locations online), Mitchell was the founding president and CEO of ChainDrugStore.net. He prepared the company for acquisition by a private investor in 2006. ChainDrugStore.net is a web-based communication network connecting product manufacturers with the retailers of those products in the retail pharmacy space. Here, Mitchell's team acquired, retained, and grew customer relationships with 25 Fortune 500 companies, including AstraZeneca, Bristol-Myers Squibb, Cardinal Health, Costco, CVS, Eli Lilly, GlaxoSmithKline, Novartis, and Rite Aid.

On February 3, 2011, AccuWeather announced the hiring of Mitchell as the chief commercial officer of AccuWeather Enterprise Solutions. On April 17, 2013, S4 Consulting announced the appointment of Mitchell as their new president. Previously, he served as the Pharma and Health Care Practice Leader for five years at S4. S4 Consulting is a management advisory services firm headquartered in Columbus, Ohio. The firm was founded in 1986 and helps clients drive growth by optimizing internal and external business-to-business relationships.
