= Colby Cave =

Canadian ice hockey player (1994–2020)

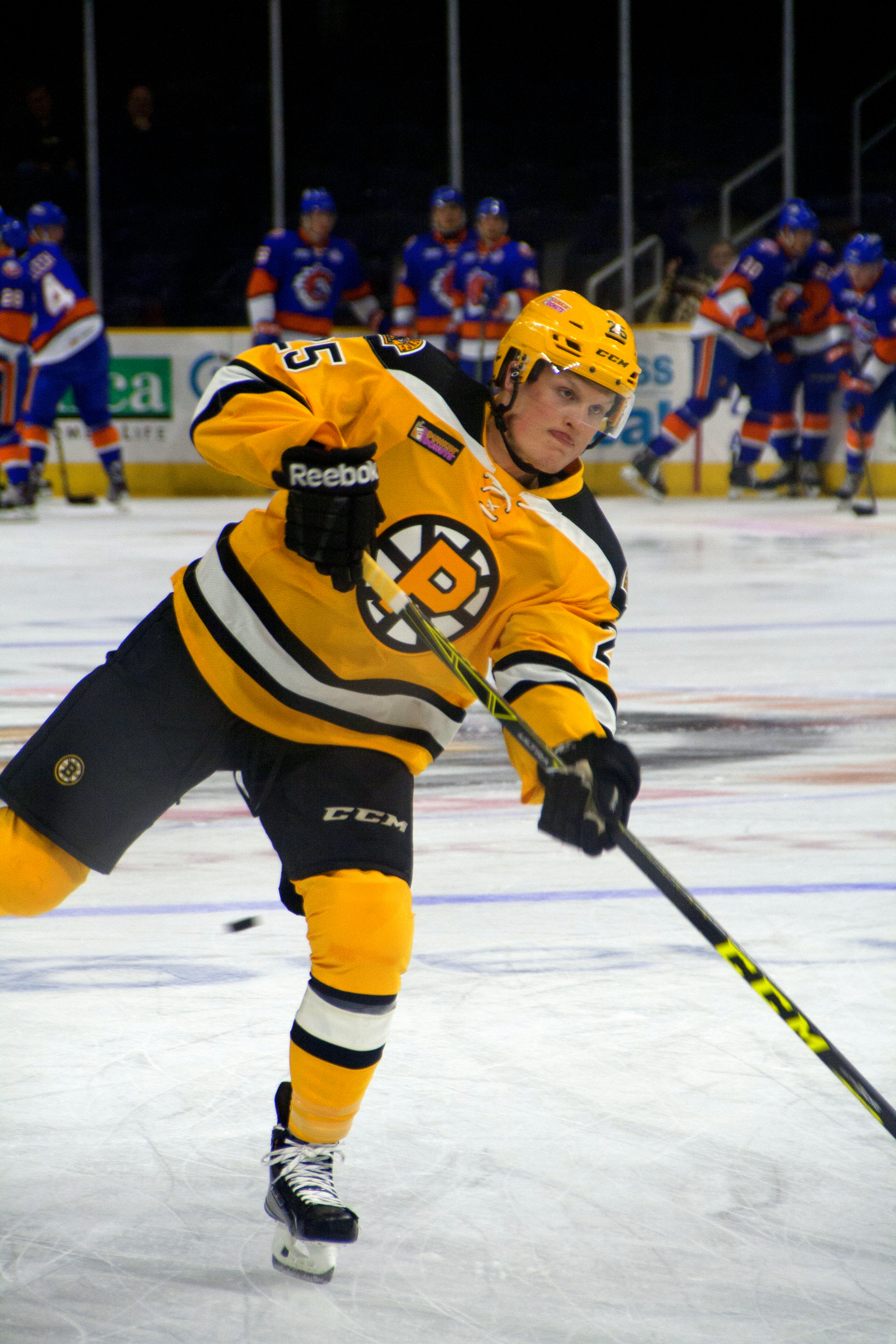
- Cave with the Providence Bruins in 2015
- Born: December 26, 1994 North Battleford, Saskatchewan, Canada
- Died: April 11, 2020 (aged 25) Toronto, Ontario, Canada
- Height: 6 ft 1 in (185 cm)
- Weight: 200 lb (91 kg; 14 st 4 lb)
- Position: Centre
- Shot: Left
- Played for: Boston Bruins; Edmonton Oilers
- NHL draft: Undrafted
- Playing career: 2015–2020

Colby Alexander Cave (December 26, 1994 – April 11, 2020) was a Canadian professional ice hockey player. He was a centre in the National Hockey League (NHL) for the Boston Bruins and the Edmonton Oilers.

Cave was born in North Battleford, Saskatchewan, and began playing minor ice hockey in the Saskatchewan Male U18 AAA Hockey League. The Kootenay Ice of the Western Hockey League (WHL) selected him in the first round of the 2009 WHL Bantam Draft, but traded his junior ice hockey rights to the Swift Current Broncos in 2011. As an undrafted free agent in 2015, Cave signed an entry-level contract with the Bruins, and spent five seasons in the Boston system before being claimed off waivers by the Oilers. Cave made 67 total NHL appearances between 2015 and 2020, scoring nine points.

On the evening of April 6, 2020, Cave began complaining of headaches. His condition deteriorated throughout the night, and he was airlifted to Sunnybrook Hospital in Toronto, where doctors performed emergency surgery to remove a colloid cyst that was causing brain bleed. After spending four days in a medically induced coma, Cave died on April 11, 2020, at the age of 25. News of his death was met with memorials from his hockey teammates and coaches, as well as the establishment of the Colby Cave Memorial Fund.

== Early life ==
Cave was born on December 26, 1994, in North Battleford, Saskatchewan, to Al and Jennifer Cave. Colby and his sister Taylor grew up just outside of Battleford, on the family cattle farm. Cave began ice skating at the age of three, and started playing ice hockey when he was five years old. In addition to hockey, he enjoyed playing with toy cars and tractors and watching John Wayne films. His favourite film growing up was The Lion King, which he continued to enjoy well into adulthood.

Cave began playing minor ice hockey in the Saskatchewan Male U18 AAA Hockey League. While playing with the Battlefords Bantam AA Barons and the Battlefords Midget AAA Stars, Cave scored 29 goals and 43 assists between 2009 and 2011. During his second season with the Stars, Cave served as team captain. Before being called up to the Western Hockey League (WHL), Cave also played three games with the Battlefords North Stars of the Saskatchewan Junior Hockey League.

== Playing career ==
=== Junior ===
The Kootenay Ice selected Cave in the first round, 13th overall, of the 2009 WHL Bantam Draft. The Swift Current Broncos, managed by Mark Lamb, acquired Cave's junior ice hockey rights in January 2011, as part of a trade that sent Cody Eakin to the Ice. Cave made his WHL debut with the Broncos the next month, on February 25, 2011.

In 2011–12, his first full season playing in the WHL, Cave scored six goals and 10 assists for a total of 16 points in 70 games for the Broncos. He more than doubled these numbers in the 2012–13 season, posting 21 goals and 20 assists in 72 appearances with the Broncos. Going into the 2013 NHL entry draft, the NHL Central Scouting Bureau ranked Cave 89th among all North American skaters, and 42nd among WHL skaters in their final-season rankings. In advance of the 2013–14 WHL season, Cave was named the captain of the Broncos, succeeding Adam Lowry. In 2014–15, Cave returned as captain and set career offensive highs with 75 points (35 goals and 40 assists) in 72 games. He was awarded both Team MVP and the Coach's Award from the Broncos at the conclusion of the season.

Across his junior hockey career, Cave played 302 WHL games with the Broncos, including 287 regular-season matches and 15 playoff appearances. In those, he collected 202 regular-season points (95 goals and 107 assists) and eight playoff points (four goals and four assists). While playing with the Broncos, Cave also befriended teammate Jake DeBrusk, who would play with him in the Boston Bruins organization.

=== Professional ===
==== Boston Bruins (2015–2019) ====
On April 7, 2015, the Boston Bruins of the National Hockey League (NHL) signed Cave as an undrafted free agent to an entry-level contract with their American Hockey League (AHL) affiliate, the Providence Bruins. Cave made his AHL debut a week later, in a 4–1 loss to the Hartford Wolf Pack on April 12, 2015. During the 2015–16 AHL season, Cave's first full season with the Providence Bruins, he appeared in 75 regular season games and scored 13 goals and 16 assists for 29 points, as well as two goals and one assist in three playoff appearances. The following year, Cave was named alternate captain of the Providence Bruins at the age of 22. The 2016–17 AHL season was an offensive improvement for Cave, who recorded 13 goals and 22 assists in the regular season, as well as one goal and five assists in 17 playoff appearances.

During the 2017–18 NHL season, the final season of his rookie contract with the Bruins, Cave received his first recall to the NHL on an emergency basis on December 21, 2017. He made his NHL debut the same day, playing on the same line as former Broncos junior teammate Jake DeBrusk in a 2–1 shootout victory over the Winnipeg Jets. Following his debut, Cave was reassigned to Providence. He played most of the season with the Providence Bruins, returning as alternate captain and scoring 11 goals and 22 assists in 72 AHL games. Cave was once again called up to the NHL in April, filling in for injured skater Tommy Wingels in two games against the Florida Panthers.

In his first three years in the AHL, Cave missed only five regular-season games, with four of those absences attributed to NHL call-ups. On July 14, 2018, Cave signed a two-year, two-way contract with the Bruins. During another NHL call-up in the 2018–19 season, Cave was briefly promoted to playing on the top line of the Bruins' offence, filling Patrice Bergeron's usual position centering Brad Marchand and David Pastrnak. While Cave made no shots on goal in the 2–1 shootout loss against the New York Islanders, he won four out of seven faceoffs and spent a career-high 19 minutes and 54 seconds on the ice. On December 17, 2018, Cave scored his first NHL career goal with 26 seconds left in the second period in a 4–0 shutout of the Montreal Canadiens. On January 15, 2019, the Bruins placed Cave on waivers. At the time, he had played 20 games with the organization, and had logged one goal and five points.

==== Edmonton Oilers (2019–2020) ====
On January 15, 2019, the Edmonton Oilers claimed Cave off of waivers from the Bruins, intending to place him on a line with Jujhar Khaira. Cave scored the game-winning goal in a 4–2 win over the Ottawa Senators on February 28, 2019, his first goal as an Oiler. His third period goal against the Senators on March 23, 2019, forced the game into overtime, which the Oilers eventually lost. In 33 games with the Oilers in the 2018–19 season, Cave totalled two goals and one assist.

Going into the 2019–20 season, Cave spent his time at the Oilers' training camp working on his penalty kill. On October 13, 2019, after only two season appearances, the Oilers placed Cave on waivers before assigning him to the team's AHL affiliate, the Bakersfield Condors. He spent the majority of the year in the AHL, scoring 11 goals and 12 assists in 44 games, including a goal in the final game before the COVID-19 pandemic suspended the remainder of the 2019–20 AHL season. Cave also made 11 appearances for Edmonton, scoring one goal on November 2, 2019, against Pittsburgh Penguins goaltender Matt Murray.

Cave played a total of 67 NHL games in his professional hockey career, 23 with the Bruins and 44 with the Oilers, and amassed a total of four goals and five assists.

== Player profile ==
After his death, Cave's teammates and coaches largely highlighted his ability to grow and adapt as the situation required. Mark Lamb, his coach with the Broncos, said that Cave "started off as a fourth-liner, then became a penalty killer, then a matchup guy [...] By the end he was our captain and played in all situations." Trent Whitfield, assistant coach for the Providence Bruins, praised Cave's 200-foot game and said that "[he] can come in wherever you need him". Cave struggled at times with finishing offensive plays, and relied on his Providence teammates Jay Leach and Anton Blidh to help generate confidence in his goal-scoring.

== Personal life ==
Cave married his wife Emily on July 19, 2019. At the time of his death, Cave and his wife had begun planning to reside in Boston during the hockey off-season. Colby and Emily Cave were members of the Hillsong Church.

== Death ==
After the NHL and AHL suspended operations in March 2020 due to the COVID-19 pandemic, Cave and his wife moved to Barrie, Ontario, close to his wife's family. On the night of April 6, 2020, Cave began complaining of a headache. His condition "got significantly worse" throughout the night, including multiple vomiting spells, and by the time an ambulance arrived, Cave was unresponsive and suffering from hypothermia. Doctors at the hospital in Barrie determined that Cave was suffering from a brain bleed, and he was airlifted to Sunnybrook Hospital in Toronto. Cave was given emergency surgery on April 7 to remove a colloid cyst that was putting pressure on his brain, and was placed in a medically-induced coma that same day.

Due to hospital regulations surrounding the COVID-19 pandemic, Cave's wife and family were not allowed to visit him in the hospital, and they instead communicated with him via walkie-talkie. On April 11, 2020, Cave's family and the Oilers announced that Cave had died at the age of 25. Cave's agent, Jason Davidson, told reporters that the skater's condition was not due to an accident, and was unrelated to COVID-19. Dr. Charles Tator, a Toronto neurosurgeon known for his concussion research, said that Cave's death was "very, very rare," and the result of "very bad luck."

=== Memorials ===
Due to physical distancing restrictions put into place by Canadian government officials, in-person memorials and tributes to Cave were limited. On April 13, 2020, family friend Bob Bartkewich organized a vehicle procession along Saskatchewan Highway 16 with signs and jerseys dedicated to Cave. The motorcade was led by a fire truck with a sign reading "Hometown Hockey Hero Colby Cave 1994–2020," as well as the logos of every team for whom he had played. During a team scrimmage on July 25, 2020, all Oilers wore Cave's No. 12 jersey, and his widow Emily gave each team member a handwritten letter and personal gift to keep in their lockers during the 2020 Stanley Cup playoffs.

In lieu of a large funeral, Cave's widow held an online memorial service on April 10, 2021, the day before the first anniversary of his death. Former teammates David Backes and Patrick Russell spoke on behalf of the Bruins and Oilers, respectively, and Bakersfield teammate Cooper Marody played "Agape", which he had composed in honour of Cave. Oilers captain Connor McDavid criticized the NHL for rescheduling the Oilers' match against the Calgary Flames for the same day as the virtual memorial service. The game was originally supposed to be held on May 7, but was moved up on April 5 due to COVID-19 postponements within the NHL North Division. McDavid said after the 5–0 loss, "I think you're asking a lot from guys to sit through something like [the memorial] and remember your teammate and see what they're going through—their whole family—and expect to perform that night."

=== Legacy ===
On April 14, 2020, the Oilers announced the establishment of the Colby Cave Memorial Fund, which would raise money for community programs focused on mental health initiatives and providing athletic access to underprivileged children. That July, the No. 12 jerseys that the Oilers wore during a team scrimmage were auctioned off, with the money raised going to the Memorial Fund. In October 2020, the Broncos began selling "#10 Bronco Forever" decals, featuring Cave's WHL jersey number, with proceeds benefitting the Memorial Fund.

On August 11, 2020, the Providence Bruins announced the creation of the Colby Cave Memorial Award, to be presented annually to the player who demonstrates a dedication to the community and charity. Bruins general manager Don Sweeney said in a statement that the award "is a special way to honor and remember Colby for his leadership qualities and humanitarian efforts."

== Career statistics ==
			Regular season					Playoffs
Season	Team	League	GP	G	A	Pts	PIM	GP	G	A	Pts	PIM
2008–09	Battlefords Stars	SMHL	3	0	1	1	2	—	—	—	—	—
2009–10	Battlefords Stars	SMHL	42	15	21	36	40	—	—	—	—	—
2010–11	Battlefords Stars	SMHL	44	14	22	36	28	—	—	—	—	—
2010–11	Battlefords North Stars	SJHL	3	0	1	1	0	—	—	—	—	—
2010–11	Swift Current Broncos	WHL	1	0	0	0	0	—	—	—	—	—
2011–12	Swift Current Broncos	WHL	70	6	10	16	36	—	—	—	—	—
2012–13	Swift Current Broncos	WHL	72	21	20	41	39	5	2	2	4	8
2013–14	Swift Current Broncos	WHL	72	33	37	70	30	6	0	2	2	0
2014–15	Swift Current Broncos	WHL	72	35	40	75	52	4	2	0	2	2
2014–15	Providence Bruins	AHL	1	0	0	0	0	—	—	—	—	—
2015–16	Providence Bruins	AHL	75	13	16	29	27	3	2	1	3	5
2016–17	Providence Bruins	AHL	76	13	22	35	52	17	1	5	6	18
2017–18	Providence Bruins	AHL	72	11	22	33	29	4	0	0	0	2
2017–18	Boston Bruins	NHL	3	0	0	0	2	—	—	—	—	—
2018–19	Providence Bruins	AHL	15	6	12	18	13	—	—	—	—	—
2018–19	Boston Bruins	NHL	20	1	4	5	8	—	—	—	—	—
2018–19	Edmonton Oilers	NHL	33	2	1	3	8	—	—	—	—	—
2019–20	Edmonton Oilers	NHL	11	1	0	1	4	—	—	—	—	—
2019–20	Bakersfield Condors	AHL	44	11	12	23	24	—	—	—	—	—
NHL totals			67	4	5	9	22	—	—	—	—	—

== See also ==
- List of ice hockey players who died during their careers
