= Bob Nicholson (ice hockey) =

Canadian ice hockey executive (born 1953)

- Born: May 27, 1953 (age 73); Vancouver, British Columbia, Canada
- Education: Providence College
- Occupations: Special advisor and alternate governor for OEG Inc.
- Known for: Former president & CEO of Hockey Canada
- Spouse: Lorna Schultz Nicholson
- Awards: Order of Hockey in Canada; BC Sports Hall of Fame; Queen Elizabeth II Diamond Jubilee Medal

Bob Nicholson (born May 27, 1953) is a Canadian ice hockey executive, administrator, and businessman. He has worked for Oilers Entertainment Group (OEG) since 2016, and was previously the president and chief executive officer of Hockey Canada from 1998 to 2014.

Nicholson grew up playing hockey in Penticton, British Columbia, winning a provincial title, then attended Providence College on a scholarship. He began his hockey administrator career in 1975 with BC Hockey, and worked his way up to the Canadian Amateur Hockey Association in 1989. During his tenure as president of Hockey Canada, national teams won 71 medals in international competitions, including 44 gold medals, seven Olympic gold medals, 12 world junior titles, five men's world championships, and 10 women's world championships. He transformed Hockey Canada into a profitable business, and raised the profile of the World Juniors. In addition to his work on Canadian national hockey, he spent four years as an International Ice Hockey Federation vice-president and council member.

Nicholson was inducted into the BC Sports Hall of Fame, and is a recipient of the Order of Hockey in Canada and the Queen Elizabeth II Diamond Jubilee Medal. He is married to Lorna Schultz Nicholson.

== Early life and playing career ==
Bob Nicholson was born May 27, 1953, in Vancouver, British Columbia. He grew up in Penticton, and played pond hockey and minor ice hockey in the Okanagan area. His midget team was coached by Ivan McLelland, and won a provincial championship.

Nicholson moved up to the junior ice hockey level, played three seasons with the Penticton Broncos, and was named team captain in his third season. His Broncos team won the Mowat Cup for the British Columbia Hockey League championship, and then went on to win the Doyle Cup for the BC–Alberta championship in 1973. In the Western Canada finals for the Abbott Cup, Pentiction lost in seven games to the Portage Terriers from Manitoba. Nicholson attended Providence College on a scholarship to play NCAA hockey. While in Rhode Island, he played for head coach Lou Lamoriello, and was teammates with Brian Burke, and Ron Wilson.

Career statistics			Regular Season					Playoffs
Season	Team	League	GP	G	A	Pts	PIM	GP	G	A	Pts	PIM
1970–71	Penticton Broncos	BCJHL	–	–	–	–	–	–	–	–	–	–
1971–72	Penticton Broncos	BCJHL	58	36	42	78	26	–	–	–	–	–
1972–73	Penticton Broncos	BCJHL	–	–	–	–	–	–	–	–	–	–
1973–74	Providence Friars	ECAC	24	3	2	5	6	–	–	–	–	–
Totals			82	39	44	83	32	–	–	–	–	–

== British Columbia hockey ==
Nicholson's career as a hockey administrator began in 1975, when he accepted a job at the Oak Bay Recreational Centre, in Greater Victoria, British Columbia. In Oak Bay, he created programs for youths to play hockey for fun and develop skills, and successfully grew enrollment each year, then he was hired by Dave Andrews in 1979, to become technical director of the British Columbia Amateur Hockey Association. Nicholson served in this capacity until 1989, and continued with fundamental skills development while touring the province. He was also in charge of coaching clinics for the BCAHA, and led player development camps for annual junior Olympic programs, and the program of excellence for the Canada men's national junior ice hockey team. Nicholson also coached at the junior A level, and the provincial Under-17 team at the Winter Canada Games. During the 1988 Winter Olympics in Calgary, Nichsolson was a commentator for CBC Sports.

== National hockey vice-president ==
Nicholson was named vice-president of technical operations by the Canadian Amateur Hockey Association as of July 1, 1989, when the organization looked to improve domestic programs, and became more involved in the growth of international hockey. He was appointed vice-president of programs for the CAHA in 1990, then senior vice-president in 1992. Nicholson reached a broadcast agreement with The Sports Network (TSN) executive Paul Graham in 1992, for annual coverage of Team Canada at the IIHF World Junior Championship.

Nicholson continued in the same role after the merger of the CAHA with Hockey Canada in 1994. During that time he was responsible for overseeing the new Canada women's national ice hockey team program, the existing Canada men's national junior ice hockey team, coaching and refereeing certification, developmental programs, marketing, licensing and special events. Nicholson helped negotiate with the National Hockey League to allow its players to participate in the Winter Olympic games, beginning with the 1998 Winter Olympics, which also marked the first time women's hockey was played in the Olympics.

== Hockey Canada president ==
Nicholson served as president and chief executive officer of Hockey Canada from June 1, 1998, until June 1, 2014. He was considered a relative unknown in the hockey world when he took over as president. He credited his predecessor Murray Costello, for bringing him into Hockey Canada, and for the opportunity to build on Costello's work. Nicholson's vision for Hockey Canada was to make it a more self-sufficient business, to ensure Canadian youth could play the game in a safe and fun environment, and to promote skills development and coaching education. He wanted Canadian hockey teams to aim for gold at international competitions, and disagreed with the Canadian Olympic Committee talking about personal bests, and just going to the Olympics to enjoy it. Nicholson was credited with instilling team-building components for developing team chemistry quickly in shortened competitions, which helped the national men's team win its first Olympic gold medal after a 50-year drought.

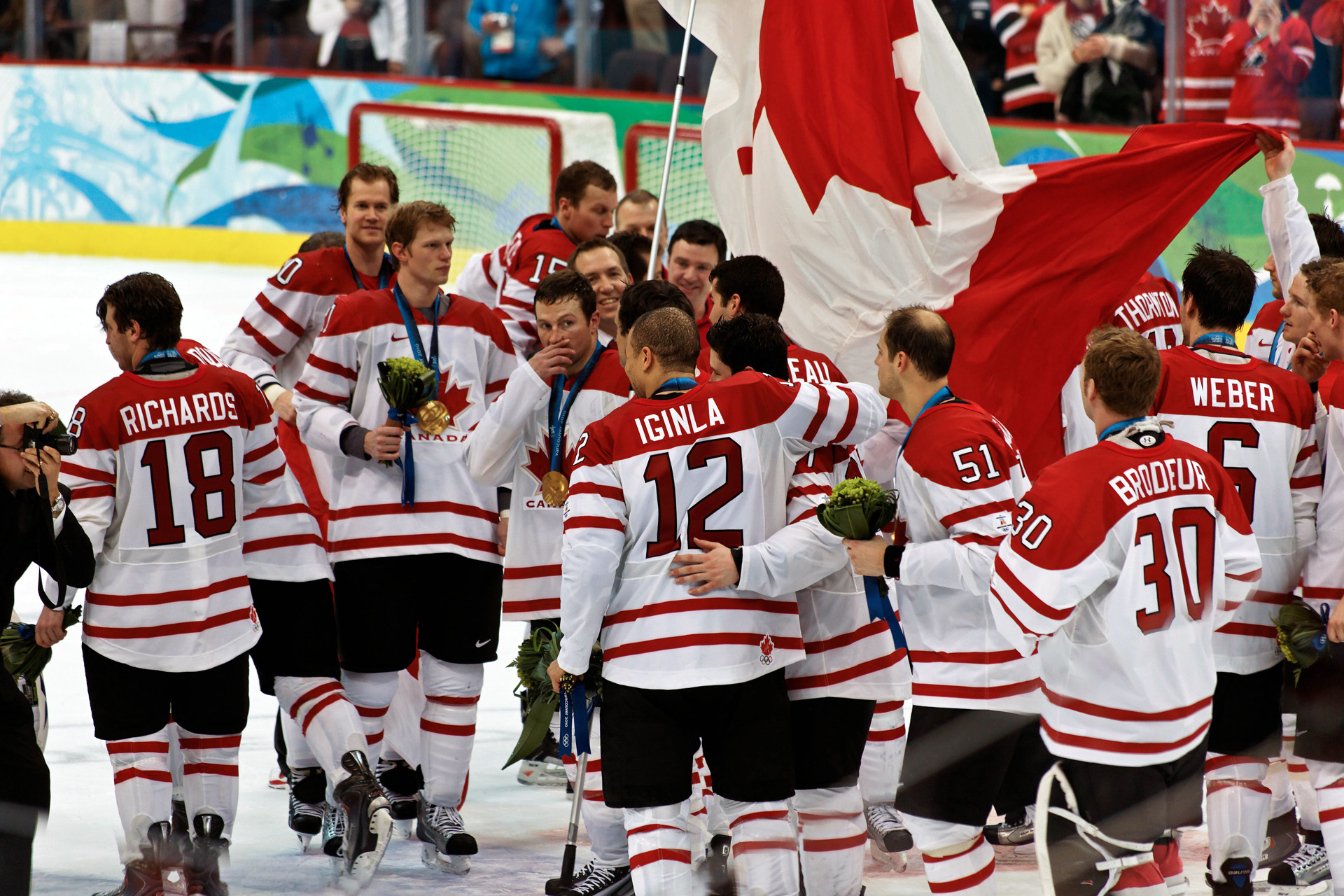
The Canada men's national team celebrate a gold medal won at the 2010 Winter Olympics

During his tenure, Canada won 71 medals in international competition including 44 gold, 20 silver, and 7 bronze. The Canadian men's team won three Winter Olympic Games gold medals in 2002, 2010, and 2014; three Ice Hockey World Championships gold medals in 2003, 2004, and 2007; and the 2004 World Cup of Hockey. The Canadian women's team were undefeated in Olympic play during his tenure, and won four consecutive Winter Olympic gold medals in 2002, 2006, 2010 and 2014; and won five IIHF World Women's Championships in 1999, 2000, 2001, 2004, 2007, and 2012. The Canadian junior team won a total of 12 IIHF World U20 Championships, including 7 while he was vice-president in 1990, 1991, 1993, 1994, 1995, 1996, and 1997, and 5 while he was president in 2005, 2006, 2007, 2008, and 2009. The Canadian under-18 men's team won the IIHF World U18 Championship in 2003, 2008, and 2013. The Canadian under-18 women's team won four IIHF World Women's U18 Championships in 2010, 2012, 2013 and 2014. The Canada men's national ice sledge hockey team won its first-ever gold medal, at the 2006 Winter Paralympics, and won two International Paralympic Committee World Championships in 2000 and 2008.

Under his management, the business side of Hockey Canada grew from 23 employees when he started, to nearly 120. Nicholson oversaw all components of the organization, including corporate sales and marketing, licensing, insurance and regulations, communications, and hockey development programs both nationally and internationally. He also led the 1999 Open Ice Summit and the 2010 World Hockey Summit, and the implementation of development programs such as the Hockey Canada Skills Academy program, the Initiation Program, and grassroots initiatives. Hockey Canada became financially successful, as rights fees for the World Juniors Championships became lucrative. Profits were also reinvested in non-North American clubs to help perpetuate the annual event. At the local youth level, he helped maintain Canadian minor hockey enrollment of over 600,000 young players, and grass-roots efforts to curb injuries, violence, and maintain the quality of coaching.

Nicholson recognized the need to surround himself with good people, such as choosing Steve Yzerman, and Mike Babcock to lead the way for the national men's team in the 2010, and 2014 Winter Olympics. He also looked to create a network of businesses and leagues, which included developing a television deal with TSN to generate income, and reaching out to the International Ice Hockey Federation (IIHF), the National Hockey League, the Canadian Hockey League, and Hockey Canada branches to make a comprehensive hockey program for Canada, and the world. Nicholson also used others to bring change, including knowledgeable people in the hockey world with similar ideas, and not being afraid to change his mind as his personal strengths. Nicholson also sacrificed a lot of personal time, and often worked day and night for success on the national stage, and thanked his family for support in trying to find balance.

Nicholson announced his resignation effective June 1, 2014, at a press conference on April 4, 2014. He began to consider his departure shortly after the 2014 Winter Olympics, stating that the time right for new leadership to take Hockey Canada to the next level, and that he would miss having "greatest job in hockey in the world." He wanted to be remembered for his impact on people, and keeping his focus on children playing the game. Hayley Wickenheiser stated that he had done a lot for her career, the national women's program, and for hockey in Canada. His personal highlights include the Canadian men's sledge hockey team winning its first gold medal, Canada's men's and women's teams winning gold at the 2010, and 2014 Winter Olympics in Vancouver, and the growth of the World Juniors tournament. Nicholson offered some advice for his successor, which included keeping the game safe for youth, and being involved in small-town hockey across Canada, keep talking about the women's and sledge hockey programs, and the rest will take care of itself. Prior to his resignation, Nicholson was rumored for the Toronto Maple Leafs general manager position in 2003, and again in 2013, and was also rumored to be joining the front office of the Calgary Flames later in 2013. Nicholson's right-hand man during his tenure was vice-president Scott Smith, who was rumored to be Nicholson's successor, however, Tom Renney replaced Nicholson as president and CEO.

== IIHF executive and committee member ==
Nicholson was elected a vice-president of the IIHF on September 25, 2012. He was chairman of the development and coaching committee, the competition and inline committee, and sat on the events and coaching committees. In this role, Nicholson had the privilege of awarding Team Canada gold medals at the 2016 IIHF World Championship. The Hockey News had speculated since 2012 that Nicholson would be in line to replace René Fasel as IIHF president, instead he remained vice-president until his term expired in 2016.

== Oilers Entertainment Group ==
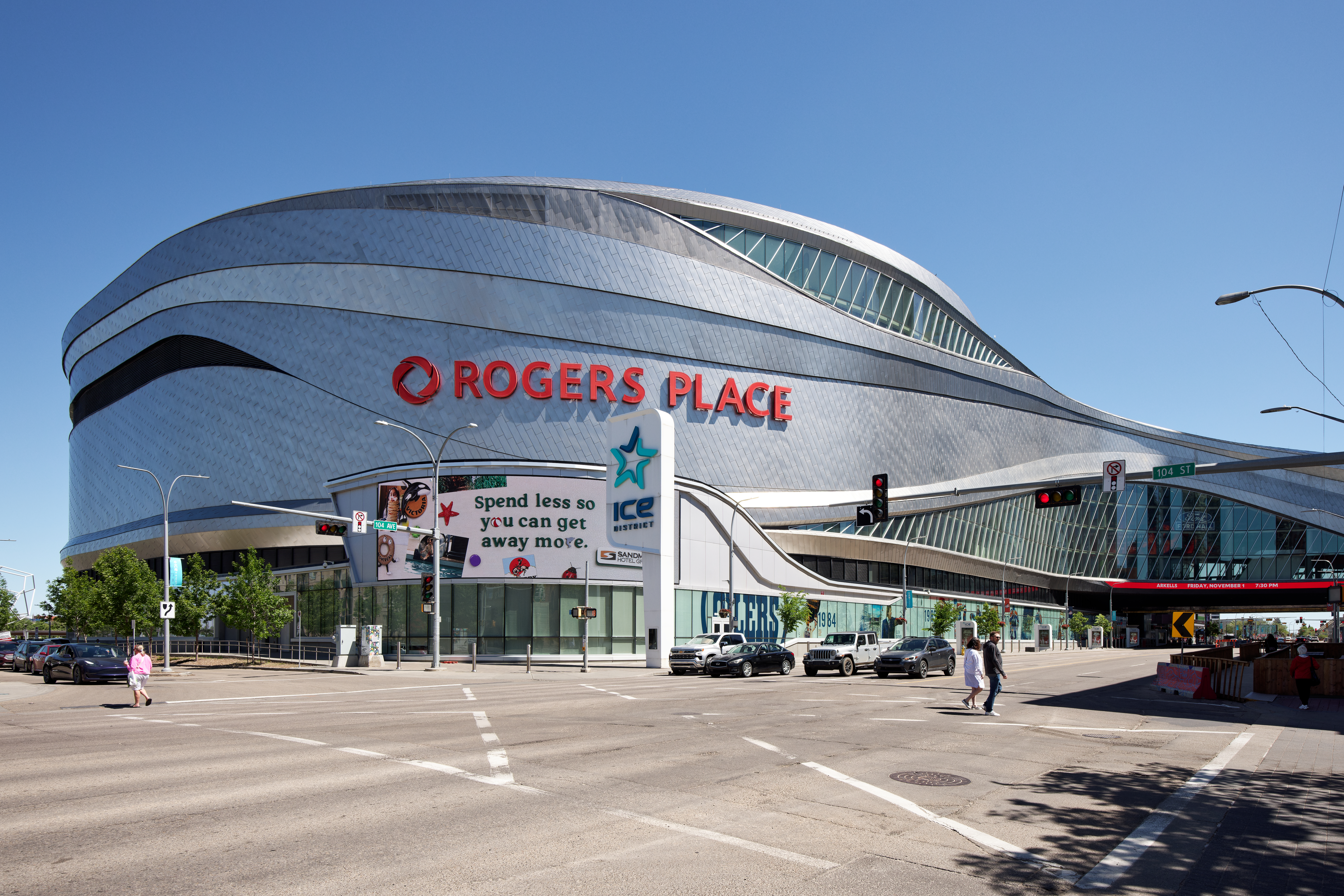
Rogers Place

Nicholson was hired by Daryl Katz on June 13, 2014, to oversee business operations and serve as vice-chairman of the Oilers Entertainment Group (OEG), working with Kevin Lowe in charge of hockey operations, and Patrick LaForge in charge of day-to-day business operations. The announcement came as part of a corporate restructuring for the Katz Group of Companies, which owns the Edmonton Oilers, the Edmonton Oil Kings, the Oklahoma City Barons, and the Bakersfield Condors, through its OEG subsidiary. Nicholson said he chose to join OEG due to previous ties with Lowe and Katz on Canada's Olympic teams, to oversee completion of Rogers Place in 2016, and turn around a franchise criticized for poor scouting and player development, which had missed the playoffs every season since 2006. Nicholson immediately engaged with team scouts, and providing ideas on improvement for the Oilers.

Nicholson also serves as an alternate governor for the Oilers on the National Hockey League board of governors. On April 20, 2015, Nicholson was appointed as chief executive officer of OEG, to oversee both the business and hockey operations. Later that week, Nicholson announced further management changes which brought in Peter Chiarelli in a dual role, to replace both Kevin Lowe as president of hockey operations, and Craig MacTavish as general manager. He also transferred Lowe to business duties, after LaForge stepped down.

Nicholson was appointed CEO and vice-chair of OEG on April 24, 2016. He then oversaw expansion of OEG's assets, fan experiences, sponsorships, and operating Rogers Place. As of 2023, he serves as special advisor of hockey operations for OEG, and sits on the board of directors. From 2019 to June 2023, he was chairman of the Edmonton Oilers. When the Oilers coordinate hosting of the 2018 Hlinka Gretzky Cup on behalf of Hockey Canada, Nicholson reached a broadcast agreement for TSN to begin televising the games in Canada

== Personal life ==
Nicholson is married to Lorna Schultz Nicholson, and they have two daughters and one son.

== Honours and awards ==
In 2004, Nicholson received the City of Penticton 55 Award, and was inducted into the BC Hockey Hall of Fame. His uniform # 6 was retired in Penticton in 2005.

Nicholson received the Queen Elizabeth II Diamond Jubilee Medal in 2013, to honour contributions to Canada. In 2014, he received the Canadian Hockey League Distinguished Service Award, the Ontario Hockey Association Gold Stick award, and was inducted into the BC Sports Hall of Fame.

Hockey Canada recognized Nicholson in 2016, naming him to the Order of Hockey in Canada.
