= Roger Gouin =

Canadian businessman and philanthropist (born 1950)

- Born: Roger Giles Gouin; July 15, 1950 (age 75); Edmonton, Alberta, Canada
- Spouse: Peggy Dubensky (m. 1971; died 2021)
- Parent(s): Carol Kostelic Gouin; Jean Ivan Gouin

Roger Gouin (born July 15, 1950) is a Canadian businessman and philanthropist who with his brother, Martin Paul Gouin, own Norama Inc., a private investment firm located in Edmonton, Alberta. Prior to Norama, Roger and Martin owned and operated North American Construction Group (NACG), with divisions that included mining, heavy construction, industrial services, piling, pipelines and real estate. In 2003, NACG was sold to a Texas-based investment group, who in 2006 took the company public on the New York Stock Exchange.

== Career ==
As a teenager, beginning in 1966, Roger’s summers were spent learning about construction as a labourer, on the business end of a shovel, graduating to tractors and bulldozers. In 1971, he began a career with his father's company, North American Road, later becoming North American Construction Group (NACG).

In 1980, Roger and his brother Martin Gouin, purchased North American Road and North American Construction Group from their father and began and long and successful partnership as they expanded and re-engineered what began as a road building business, into one of Canada’s largest privately held construction groups with operations that included, mining, heavy construction, industrial services, piling, pipelining and real estate.

With sale of NACG in 2003 Roger turned to Norama Inc and its private investment portfolio, where currently he and Martin continue to manage their affairs.

In 2012, Roger, his brother Martin and their father Ivan Gouin (posthumously) were inducted into the Alberta Business Hall of Fame.

== Personal life ==
In 1971, Roger married his high school sweetheart, Peggy (née Dubensky) Gouin QC, a practicing lawyer in Edmonton, Alberta. They have two daughters, Renee and Arden. She died in 2021. His sister Renee is married to Canadian billionaire and Edmonton Oilers owner, Daryl Katz.

== Philanthropy ==
Roger Gouin is the co-chair of the Alumni of University Hospital Foundation and is actively involved in raising funds for, and supporting a broad range of community causes, including the United Way, the Cross Cancer Institute, the Alberta Cancer Foundation and the University of Alberta. In 2005, he received the Audrey Greenough Award of Merit from the University Hospital Foundation.

Roger has been a member of many boards, including the University Hospital Foundation, the Mental Health Foundation, the Edmonton Petroleum Club, Royal Mayfair Golf and Country Club and the Art Gallery of Alberta. He also co-chaired the Edmonton Homeless Commission and was active in the Young Presidents’ Organization, World Presidents’ Organization, the Prairie Road Builders’ Association as well as the Canadian Construction Association.
