= David Branch =

Dave Branch or David Branch may refer to:

- David Branch (ice hockey) (1948–2026), Canadian ice hockey administrator
- David Branch (fighter) (born 1981), American mixed martial artist
