= Value Drug Mart =

Western Canadian drug store

Value Drug Mart Associates Ltd.
- Company type: Independent Pharmacy
- Industry: Pharmacy Retail
- Founded: Alberta (1978)
- Area served: Alberta & British Columbia
- Products: Medication Food Body Hygiene Products
- Website: Value Drug Mart

Value Drug Mart is a Western Canada drug store serving over 36 locations throughout Alberta and British Columbia.

== History ==
What is now known as Value Drug Mart Associates Ltd. was founded by pharmacist Barry Katz (whose son Daryl Katz would go on to found Canada's largest chain of pharmacies, the Katz Group of Companies) and twelve other pharmacists in 1978.

Since 1983, VDMA has been the sole sponsor of the annual Value Drug Mart Spring Classic hockey tournament that takes place in Calgary, Alberta. The tournament is a weekend-long competition of ice hockey teams from across the province of Alberta.

== Products ==
In addition to prescription drugs, lottery tickets, snack foods, soda, magazines, movies, books, fragrances, gifts, and stationery are sold in most locations. A post office is within some stores.

== Locations ==
Value Drug Mart operates over 35 locations in the provinces of Alberta and British Columbia. It is not a franchise; rather, the different locations own VDMA as shareholders.
