= Dusty Button =

American ballerina

- Born: June 6, 1989 (age 37); Myrtle Beach, South Carolina, United States
- Education: Jacqueline Kennedy Onassis School; Royal Ballet School
- Occupation: Ballet dancer
- Years active: 2012–present
- Spouse: Mitchell Taylor Button
- Dancing career
- Former groups: Boston Ballet

Dusty Button (born June 6, 1989) is an American ballet dancer. She was born in Myrtle Beach, South Carolina. At age sixteen, she moved to New York to train at the Jacqueline Kennedy Onassis School at the American Ballet Theatre. After that, she was invited to the ABT II company. In 2006, she was awarded the Bronze Finalist Medal at the Youth America Grand Prix. She later joined the Royal Ballet School, in 2008 where she also performed professional roles at the Royal Opera House. She joined the Boston Ballet corps de ballet in 2012, was promoted to soloist in 2013 and principal in 2014.

A federal lawsuit in 2021 accused Button of federal sex trafficking and forced labor violations.

== Early life ==
Dusty Button was born in Myrtle Beach, South Carolina on June 6, 1989. Button began dancing at age seven, taking classes in tap, jazz, hip hop and ballet. Button competed in dance competitions across the United States and, at the age of 13, spent a week at The Royal Ballet School in London, cultivating her love for ballet. At the age of 16, she started attending the Jacqueline Kennedy Onassis School at ABT. Upon graduating from the Jacqueline Kennedy Onassis School at ABT, Button was invited to join the ABT studio company, ABT 2. To the surprise of many, she turned it down, and decided to enroll full-time at The Royal Ballet School to finish her training.

== Career ==
Button's professional career began at age ten, when she was cast in the Radio City Christmas Spectacular. In 2008, she joined The Royal Ballet School. She joined Boston Ballet's corps de ballet in 2012 under the direction of Mikko Nissinen. She was promoted to soloist in 2013, and principal in 2014. Button has performed with Broadway Underground, David Bintley's Cinderella, and with the English National Ballet School on the BBC in England. She now serves as a faculty member for Showstoppers dance convention, teaching classes for young, aspiring dancers. Button has been featured in Glamour Magazine, Pointe Magazine, Dance Europe, Dance Spirit Magazine, Dance Magazine, Dance Informa and many others. She was featured on the 2015 Pointe Magazine cover where she was labeled as "A New Brand of Ballerina". Pointe also remarks, "onstage, Dusty defies categorization".

Button was not named to the Boston Ballet's 2017 roster.

== Federal sexual assault lawsuit ==
In July 2021, a complaint was filed in the US District Court in Nevada against Button's husband, Mitchell Taylor Button, a former dance teacher, accusing him of sexually abusing at least nine dancers, including Sage Humphries and Gina Menichino. Humphries was in an apprentice program with the Boston Ballet in 2016 when the couple allegedly "sexually and verbally abused her, forced her to live with them and isolated her from her family." Menichino alleges that Taylor Button "sexually assaulted her when she was 13 years old and he was her 25-year-old dance instructor." Menchino reported Button in 2018, but the police did not have enough evidence to move forward with the case. The suit also includes abuse against of at least five students in Florida; Dusty Button is named as being involved in the abuse and molestation of at least two other unnamed dancers, one of whom was 11 years old.

Initially, Button was named as a "non-party co-conspirator" but was not included in the legal dispute. The lawsuit alleges that "the Buttons abuse their positions of power and prestige in the dance community to garner the loyalty and trust of young dancers" and that the couple would "exploit those relationships to coerce sexual acts by means of force and fraud." The couple's lawyer has stated that the couple "categorically den[ies] these baseless claims and they look forward to the opportunity through court proceedings to disprove all of the plaintiffs' false and fraudulent allegations."

Taylor Button's lawyer attempted to dismiss the allegations, citing Nevada's statute of limitations and claiming that the allegations “were written to make the press interested in this case and to enflame the anger of anyone who reads the Complaint." A judge denied the request, and more accusers came forward.

In September 2021, the federal complaint was updated and Dusty Button was included as a defendant. The Buttons are accused of sex trafficking and sexual abuse of seven dancers, including a minor, between 2007 and 2014. The plaintiffs include Humphries and Menichino, as well as Rosie DeAngelo and Dani X, who were both teenagers at the time of their alleged assaults. Menichino, DeAngelo, and X all attended Centerstage Dance Academy in Tampa, Florida around the same time.

The complaint states, "This is a case about a couple who exploited their position of power and influence in the dance world to sexually abuse young dancers across the country."

In 2022, court documents included claims of federal sex trafficking and forced labor violations against both Dusty and Taylor Button, as well as separate accusations about Taylor Button for assault, battery, false imprisonment, and sexual exploitation of a minor. The Buttons' lawyer, Marc Randazza, filed a motion to dismiss the case, denying any wrongdoing.

On July 8, 2022, they "filed a third-party counterclaim in U.S. District Court in Nevada," in which they claimed having been in a consensual, "loving and supportive" relationship with Humphries. The counterclaim also includes a U.S. civil suit was filed against the Edmonton Oilers' owner, Daryl Katz, alleging he paid Humphries $75,000 for sexual favors. Katz was 53 at the time; Humphries was 17. In the counterclaim, Randazza wrote, "To the extent that Sage Humphries claims she was abused and sex trafficked, the Buttons agree — however, this abuse and trafficking was not at their hands, but at the hands of a series of older men." Randazza further claimed, "Humphries was literally a child prostitute to a billionaire, and her mother assisted her in laundering the money she was paid and in trafficking her to Katz."

Katz's lawyer, Robert Klieger, has denied the claims of sexual misconduct but admits Katz and Humphries had met in 2016 regarding Humphries's film project. Katz has confirmed he arranged to pay $75,000 toward her film. Key evidence against Katz involves screenshots of text conversations between Humphries and Katz, but the authenticity of the texts remains in question. The alleged text messages do not contain sexually explicit content but show a desire for secrecy. According to Humphries's claims, the texts would have been received while Taylor Button had control of her phone.

Humphries's lawyer, Sigrid McCawley, denied the claim against Katz referred to the counterclaim against Katz as a "meaningless sideshow" to distract from the Button case.
