= Order of Hockey in Canada =

Canadian ice hockey award

- Awarded for: Contributions to ice hockey in Canada
- Presented by: Hockey Canada
- Established: April 2, 2012; 14 years ago
- First award: April 10, 2012; 14 years ago

The Order of Hockey in Canada is an award given out annually by Hockey Canada. It honours Canadian ice hockey players, coaches and executives and recognizes their contributions to the game. The first group of honourees was announced on April 10, 2012.

== History ==
The Order of Hockey in Canada was first announced on April 2, 2012. It is awarded "on the basis of their outstanding contributions or service to the growth and development of the sport of hockey in Canada, which may include players, coaches, officials, administrators, executives, trainers, physicians, inventors or any other person whose role or service in the game is recognized as extraordinary."

Honourees are selected by a 12 member committee. The executive committee members include Murray Costello, Jeff Denomme, Jim Hornell, and Bob Nicholson. The selection committee members include Jim Treliving (chairman), David Andrews, Gilles Courteau, Joe Drago, Pierre LeBrun, Roy MacGregor, Bob McKenzie, Pat Quinn, Glen Sather, Danièle Sauvageau, Scott Smith and Donna Spencer."

== Eligibility ==
Candidates for election as Distinguished Honourees of the Order of Hockey in Canada shall be chosen "on the basis of their outstanding contributions or service to the growth and development of the sport of hockey in Canada, which may include players, coaches, officials, administrators, executives, trainers, physicians, inventors or any other person whose role or service in the game is recognized as extraordinary."

Candidates are eligible as long as they have concluded their career as an active player or official, if either is applicable, for a minimum of five playing seasons before their election. All other candidates may be either active or inactive at the time of his or her selection. However, there will be no posthumous appointments to the Order of Hockey in Canada. In 2012, five were selected. After that, a maximum of three will be selected annually.

== Selection process ==
A selection committee of 12 members was appointed by the Order of Hockey in Canada executive committee, which was established by Hockey Canada. The selection committee members, representing a cross-section of individuals with great and varied experience around the game of hockey in Canada, have been selected for a three-year term and can serve for a maximum of nine years. Each committee member can only bring forward one name as an official nomination for consideration annually. After inducting five individuals in the first group in the spring of 2012, a maximum of three recipients will be selected annually.

== Honourees ==
Class	Honourees
2012	Jean Béliveau, Cassie Campbell, Wayne Gretzky, Gordie Howe, Gord Renwick
2013	Clare Drake, Paul Henderson, Dave King, Mark Messier
2014	Jim Gregory, France Saint-Louis, Steve Yzerman
2015	David Branch, Pat Quinn, Serge Savard
2016	Geraldine Heaney, Mario Lemieux, Bob Nicholson
2017	Scotty Bowman, Murray Costello, Fran Rider
2018	Mike Babcock, Danielle Goyette, Ryan Smyth
2019	Jayna Hefford, Ken Hitchcock, George Kingston
2020	Ken Dryden, Sheldon Kennedy, Charles Tator
2021	Bill Hay, Angela James, Kevin Lowe
2022	Guy Lafleur, Lanny McDonald, Kim St-Pierre

== Trophy ==
Instead of individual medals, a trophy honours the winners. It consists of a maple leaf symbol (red stick blades), gold and transparent components. The trophy's base has the name of the Order and a lower band with the names and years of the nominees.

== See also ==
- Hockey Hall of Fame
- IIHF Hall of Fame
- Royal Canadian Mint ice hockey coins
- Canada's Sports Hall of Fame
- Order of Canada
