= Daryl Katz =

Canadian businessman and philanthropist

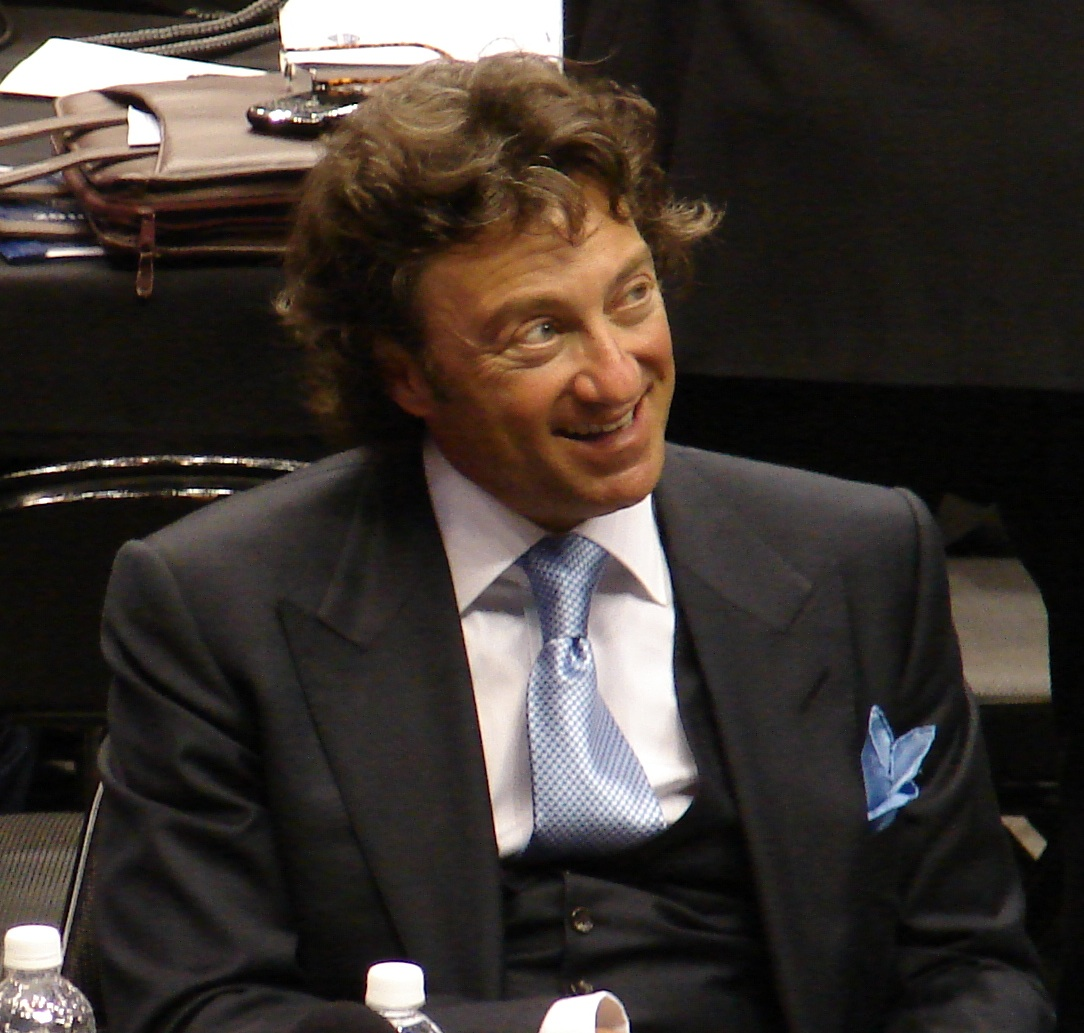
- Katz in 2010
- Born: Daryl Allan Katz; May 31, 1961 (age 65); Edmonton, Alberta, Canada
- Education: University of Alberta (BA, LLB)
- Occupations: Chairman and CEO, Katz Group
- Known for: Owner, Edmonton Oilers
- Spouse: Renee Gouin
- Children: 2
- Website: https://darylkatz.com/

Daryl Allan Katz (/keɪts/; born May 31, 1961) is a Canadian businessman. Katz is the founder and chairman of the Katz Group of Companies, one of Canada's largest privately owned enterprises, with pharmacy, sports & entertainment, and real estate development businesses. Katz Group owns the Edmonton Oilers and led the development of Rogers Place and the Ice District.

== Early life ==
Daryl Katz was born in 1961 in Edmonton, Alberta. His father was a pharmacist who along with Bob Porozni founded Value Drug Mart in Edmonton in the 1970s. Katz attended the Edmonton Talmud Torah day school during his elementary years and then graduated from Jasper Place High School. He then attended the University of Alberta, graduating with an arts degree in 1982 and with a law degree in 1985.

== Pharmacy business ==
After school, he worked for a time at the law firm Shoctor, Mousseau, and Starkman, and then started his practice focusing on corporate and franchise law. In 1991, in a partnership with his father, Katz paid $300,000 for the Canadian rights to the US-based Medicine Shoppe drugstore franchise which had over 1,000 stores in the United States. In 1992, they opened the first Medicine Shoppe store and Katz founded the Katz Group of Companies which was to become the holding company for the group. In 1996, Katz purchased the storied but fading Rexall drugstore chain in Canada which at the time, only consisted of several dozen stores. The business grew and by 1998, the Katz Group consisted of 80 Rexall stores, 30 Medicine Shoppe outlets, and a few smaller independent retailers. In 1997, he purchased the Ontario-based, 143-store Pharma Plus drugstore chain from the supermarket operator Oshawa Group for $100 million. Katz reportedly retains a small circle of highly paid executives who run the Katz Group. Rexall Pharmacy is run from Ontario, while other subsidiaries of Katz Group maintain private headquarters separate from Katz Group itself.

In 1999 he ventured into the US with the purchase of the money-losing, $300 million in sales, Minnesota-based Snyders Drug Store chain; in 2001, he purchased the U.S.-based Drug Emporium big-box discount chain. His foray into the US market was not without failure: the Snyder's chain filed for bankruptcy in 2003 and its 25 stores were sold to Walgreens. In 2004, Katz purchased the naming rights for ten years to the new $45-million Rexall Centre, a 12,500-seat tennis and entertainment complex on the campus of York University. In January 2012, he sold Drug Trading Co. and Medicine Shoppe Canada to the US-based drug distributor McKesson Corporation for $1.2 billion. Katz Group sold its network of approximately 460 outlets to McKesson Corporation in 2016 for C$3 billion.

== Purchase of Edmonton Oilers and Creation of Oilers Entertainment Group (OEG) ==
In May 2007, Katz made a $145 million bid to buy the Edmonton Oilers franchise, which the owners of the team, the Edmonton Investors Group (EIG), quickly rejected, stating the team was not for sale.

In July 2007, he made another bid for the Oilers of $185 million, which EIG turned down on August 7, 2007. On December 12, 2007, Katz made an offer of $188 million to the EIG. The Board of the EIG announced in January 2008 that it would again recommend to its shareholders to reject this latest bid.

On January 28, 2008, Katz increased his offer to $200 million and extended the acceptance deadline to February 5, 2008, at which time Katz was notified by the EIG that all its members agreed to sell the Oilers, pending league and financial approval. On June 18, 2008, Katz received approval from the National Hockey League to purchase the Oilers, and on July 2, 2008, he was officially announced as the owner during a press conference at Rexall Place, where he was presented with an Edmonton Oilers Jersey with the number "08" and his last name patched onto the back.

In June 2014, Katz Group announced that Bob Nicholson would join the organization as Vice-Chairman of Oilers Entertainment Group (OEG), a new sports and entertainment company that would manage the Katz Group's sports and entertainment assets, and operate Rogers Place, the new home of the Edmonton Oilers.

In addition to the Oilers, OEG owns and operates the Edmonton Oil Kings (WHL), and Bakersfield Condors (AHL) as well as Aquila Productions (a film and production company). Nicholson was named CEO of OEG in April 2015 and given responsibility for both business and hockey operations.

In April 2015, Katz announced a partnership with Joel Silver to create Silver Pictures Entertainment – a new company to develop, produce and provide or arrange financing for feature films, television and digital projects. Katz's interests in the company fall under the Oilers Entertainment Group umbrella. However, the partnership was dissolved in 2019 and Silver Pictures carried on under Hal Sadoff.

== Rogers Place and Edmonton Ice District (former Arena District) ==
Katz has said that he bought the Oilers because he saw Edmonton's need for a new arena as an opportunity to be a catalyst for the revitalization of Edmonton's downtown core. Following public consultations and negotiations with the City of Edmonton, Katz Group and the city agreed to a public-private partnership to build the Rogers Place arena, which would see the city retain ownership of the building, while the Katz Group would operate it. The City's portion of the arena funding would be paid through a Community Revitalization Levy and not result in any cost to taxpayers. Construction on the project began March 2014.

Opened in September 2016, Rogers Place was marketed as one of North America's most advanced sports & entertainment venues, active year-round and featuring a 24,000 square foot grand entrance-way called Ford Hall which can be used as public/private programmable space.

With Rogers Place at its core, the Katz Group began construction of the Edmonton Arena District (EAD), which was to be one of Canada's largest mixed-use sports and entertainment development. The EAD was planned to cover 25 contiguous acres of downtown Edmonton, and feature a 50,000 square foot public plaza, two office towers, a JW Marriott Hotel, a Gateway casino, over 1,000 luxury condos and rental apartments, and 270,000 square feet of retail space at a total cost of approximately $2.5 billion. In 2014, it was announced that the City of Edmonton and Stantec would be the major tenants of the two respective office towers. Stantec's tower will be the tallest in Edmonton at 69 stories.

The Edmonton Arena District was formally renamed the Ice District on July 13, 2015.

== Philanthropy ==
In October 2006 Katz announced a $7 million donation to the University of Alberta Faculty of Pharmacy and Pharmaceutical Sciences and Faculty of Law. Matched by the province, the gift was the largest donation ever to a Canadian pharmacy school. The west wing of the Health Research Innovation Facility at the corner of 87th Avenue and 114th Street in Edmonton has been named The Katz Group Centre for Pharmacy and Health Research. In 2009 Katz donated $20 Million to Mount Sinai Hospital in Toronto and founded The Daryl A Katz Centre For Urgent And Critical Care. Katz has also given "millions" to the Stollery Children's Hospital in Edmonton, as well as supporting public events.

Between 2005 and 2010, Katz and his wife donated "over $50 million" to organizations and institutions across Canada.

== Personal life ==
As of November 2022, Katz' net worth is reported at US$4.2 billion, according to Forbes.

Katz is married to Renee Gouin. She is the daughter of Jean Yvon (Ivan) Gouin. In 1952, her father founded the North American Construction Group which became one of the largest mining and heavy construction companies in Canada. The couple have twin children, Chloe and Harrison, who are the founders of the nonprofit Hockey Helps Kids organization.

=== Health issues ===
In 2019, the Oilers Entertainment Group released a statement confirming that Katz has been suffering from a life-threatening, antibiotic-resistant bacterial sinus infection. Sportsnet hockey analyst John Shannon tweeted that Katz carried an IV bag around the clock during the Edmonton Oilers’ playoff run in 2017. He also underwent three surgeries in ten months to battle the infection which has a 50-50 survival rate, and his current prognosis looks positive.

=== Allegations of sexual misconduct ===
In early 2017, Katz was accused by Brazilian actress and model Greice Santo and her husband R. J. Cipriani of offering money to the former in exchange for sexual favors. Santo also denounced Michael Gelmon, Katz's cousin and associate, for defending him and threatening to end her career in Hollywood if she spoke about the case.

In July 2022, Boston Ballet ballerina Dusty Button and her husband, defendants in a U.S. civil suit filed by Sage Humphries and six other ballerinas accusing the Buttons of sexual abuse, filed a counterclaim alleging that Katz paid Humphries $75,000 in exchange for sexual favors. Humphries denied having had any sexual relationship with Katz. In August 2022, the couple voluntarily withdrew their claims against Katz; their lawyer issued an apology and requested that the court strike all relevant references from the record.

Sporting positions
Preceded by Cal Nichols	Edmonton Oilers owner 2008–present	Incumbent
