= Lorna Schultz Nicholson =

Canadian author

- Education: University of Victoria
- Genre: Sports, children's books
- Spouse: Bob Nicholson

Website
- Official website

Lorna Schultz Nicholson is a Canadian author of several children's books about sports.

Raised in St. Catharines, Ontario, Nicholson obtained a B.Sc. in Human Performance from the University of Victoria. With her degree, she worked as the Fitness and Recreation Co-ordinator at the University of Victoria where she also coached rowing. Nicholson now resides in Calgary, Alberta with her husband, former Hockey Canada President Bob Nicholson. She has been an active presence in Canadian media, on television, radio and in print.

== Writing career ==
Nicholson began writing as a co-host and script writer for an aerobic television show in Victoria, British Columbia. After moving to Ottawa, Ontario, she worked as a health and lifestyles reporter for a news show and researcher for a sports show, Donohue's Legends, at CJOH television. She later hosted, produced and wrote all the material for her own syndicated radio show in Ottawa, Family Time.

While having shared her keen sense of sports and community in all her work, Nicholson described that only when she sat down at her computer to write fiction did she feel peace. The author of several sports novels for children, she also writes mystery novels and scripts for adults. She is currently the vice-president for the Prairie region for the Crime Writers of Canada. Nicholson is the author of the Intuko/Angie Melville adult mysteries.

== Bibliography ==
=== Children's fiction ===
- Int. Halifax: Lorimer, 2004.
- Roughing . Halifax: Lorimer, 2004.
- Against the Boards. Halifax: Lorimer, 2005.
- Delaying the Game. Halifax: Lorimer, 2005.
- Northern Star. Halifax: Lorimer, 2006.
- Too Many Men. Halifax: Lorimer, 2006.
- Cross-Check! Halifax: Lorimer, 2007.
- H.E.A.R.T. H.B. Fenn, 2007. ISBN 1-55168-315-6 (forthcoming)

=== Mystery novels ===
- See Fox Run. Echelon, 2006.
