= Silver Pictures =

American film production company

- Industry: Motion pictures
- Founded: June 24, 1980; 46 years ago
- Founder: Joel Silver
- Headquarters: Los Angeles, California, United States
- Key people: Ethan Erwin (president); Hal Sadoff (CEO); Susan Downey
- Divisions: Silver Pictures Television

Silver Pictures is an American film production company founded by Hollywood producer Joel Silver on June 24, 1980.

For many years, during the mid-1980s, the production company was based at 20th Century-Fox, but the production company was shifted to Warner Bros. in 1987. In 1996, he, along with Tales from the Crypt producer Richard Donner, launched Decade Pictures, a low-budget production unit. In 1999, it launched, along with fellow Tales from the Crypt executive producer Robert Zemeckis, Dark Castle Entertainment, which served as a venture of the studio.

Silver Pictures launched Zinc Entertainment in 2000 as a low-budget production division with Proximity (2000) as its first production.

In 2012, Joel Silver and Warner Bros. ended their 25-year production, marketing, and distribution relationship, due to Silver disagreeing with how Warner Bros. had been handling the marketing and releasing of the films his company produced. Despite having split, Silver and Warner Bros. co-produced The Nice Guys four years later. That same year, Joel Silver and Universal Studios struck a 5-year, 12-picture, North American marketing and distribution deal, starting with the Liam Neeson action thriller Non-Stop on February 28, 2014. Universal Pictures would not be a production partner with Silver Pictures, only a distributor. The second film in the distribution deal was originally going to be The Loft, a third-party film to which Silver Pictures' Dark Castle Entertainment division acquired the U.S distribution rights (as they did for Splice). Universal planned to release The Loft on August 29, 2014, but the studio pulled it from the schedule in favor of Legendary Pictures' As Above, So Below. Universal and Dark Castle sold the distribution rights to Open Road Films, who then released The Loft on January 30, 2015. Afterward, the Universal-Silver partnership was terminated, leaving Non-Stop as the only film to come out of it.

In 2015, Silver connected with Canadian financier Daryl Katz. Founder and chairman of the Katz Group of Companies, one of Canada's largest privately owned enterprises, Daryl Katz holds operations in pharmaceuticals, sports and entertainment, and real estate. The two came together to create a slate of feature films, digital projects, and television shows. Hal Sadoff, longtime packaging and finance agent, will serve as chief executive officer of Silver Pictures Entertainment. Sadoff left ICM in 2012. On November 13, 2015, Silver Pictures Television received a commitment to a first-look agreement with Lionsgate Television whereas Silver would develop projects for the studio.

Before Silver's connection with Katz, Silver Pictures required studio backing to develop and fund its films. After the formation of the new partnership, Silver possessed the ability to work on projects both inside and outside the studio system.

CEO Hal Sadoff and Silver worked together on Gothika, Thirteen Ghosts and House on Haunted Hill.

On June 24, 2019, Sadoff announced Silver's resignation from the company.
