= Jean Ivan Gouin =

Canadian businessman and investor

Jean Yvon (Ivan) Gouin
- Born: Jean Yvon Gouin; February 15, 1916; Vimy, Alberta, Canada
- Died: November 11, 2007 (aged 91)
- Occupation: Founder of North American Construction Group
- Spouse: Carol Kostelic
- Children: Roger Gouin; Martin Gouin; Elaine Busch; Renee Katz; Colette Gouin
- Parent(s): Rudolph and Rose Alma Gouin

Jean Yvon (Ivan) Gouin (February 15, 1916 – November 11, 2007) was a Canadian businessman and investor. He was the founder of North American Road Ltd., which grew to be one of the largest mining, heavy construction, industrial, piling and pipeline firms in Canada.

== Early life ==
Gouin was born to a Catholic family on February 15, 1916 in Vimy, Alberta, one of seven children of Rudolph and Rose Alma Gouin. In 1938, he worked at a grain elevator and in 1940, he purchased a general store with his sister. During World War II, he joined the Canadian Army and served in Ontario. After the war, he returned to work at his store.

== Career ==
In 1953, Gouin sold his store and he and his brother Bob purchased a small bulldozer which he used to clear the forest so farmers could plant crops. He later incorporated his company, North American Road Ltd, and seeing that the rapid expansion of farmland in the region would require additional roads to transport all the new crops, expanded the company into road-building. They soon won bids for projects in Alberta, British Columbia and the Yukon, including the famous Alaska Highway. In the 1960s, they expanded from road-building to industrial work including clearing the site for the Gardiner Dam and Lake Diefenbaker in Southern Saskatchewan and then began providing services for Suncor's Oil Sands development in the Fort McMurray area. Thereafter, they expanded into mining, pipelines and foundation piles. In 1972, Gouin purchased his brother's share of the business. In 1980, Gouin sold the company to his two sons. In 2003, the company was sold to a Texas-based international investment group for around CAD 405 million. At the time, North American Road Ltd had invested heavily in the mining industry incurring high levels of debt when Prime Minister Pierre Trudeau implemented the National Energy Program which put a heavy tax burden on energy companies who then pulled back on their capital investments making it difficult for North American Road Ltd to meet its debt obligations.

== Personal life ==
In 1948, Gouin married Carol Kostelic, an ethnic Slovenian immigrant from Yugoslavia. They had two sons, Roger Gouin and Martin Gouin, and three daughters, Elaine Busch, Renee Katz and Colette Gouin. His daughter Renee is married to Canadian billionaire and Edmonton Oilers owner, Daryl Katz.

Gouin died on November 11, 2007.

== Legacy ==
In 2006, through an IPO, the then renamed North American Energy Partners (NAEP) became a publicly traded company, listed on both the Toronto Stock Exchange and the New York Stock Exchange under the ticker NOA. In 2012, Gouin was inducted into the Alberta Business Hall of Fame.

Gouin's creed was: "Be fair, but be firm. And plan the next day."
