= Sage Humphries =

American model and ballet dancer

Sage Humphries (born October 3, 1997) is an American model, singer-songwriter, and dancer with the Boston Ballet.

== Ballet ==
Humphries started ballet at age four in Orange County, California.

At age 12, Humphries attended the School of American Ballet Summer Course in New York for the first time and returned the following two summers. At 14, she trained under Dmitri Kulev in Orange County.

In 2012, Humphries received positive reviews of her performances in Giselle and The Sleeping Beauty at the Carreno Dance Festival in Sarasota, Florida.

While preparing for the Youth America Grand Prix competition, Humphries appeared in the Dance School Diaries docuseries.

In 2015, she was a Denver Youth Grand Prix winner at the Youth American Grand Prix Denver Semi-Finals. That summer, she attended the American Ballet Theatre in New York on full scholarship, where she trained with Ariel Serrano and Ramona De Saa, director of the Cuban National Ballet School. While training with Kulev, Humphries received full merit scholarships to Semperoper Ballett, Ballet Munich, American Ballet Theatre, San Francisco Ballet, and Ballet West.

Humphries joined Boston Ballet II in 2016 and was promoted to artist in the Company in 2017. She debuted her choreography in 2018 with the BB@home: ChoreograpHER program. In 2019, she choreographed dances for the Boston Calling Music Festival, as well as the BB@home ChoreograpHER program.

== Modeling ==
Humphries has shot dozens of covers and magazines, including Vogue Italia, V magazine, Lucky magazine, Interview magazine, As if magazine, Glitter Magazine, Just Cavalli, Where Boston, Footwear News, Teen Vogue, and W magazine. She is also a brand ambassador for Capezio and Bloch.

At nine years old, Humphries signed with Zuri Models and Talent, through which she modeled for stores, including Target, Kohl's, and Pottery Barn.

At age 14, she signed with Ford Models, where she worked a worldwide campaign with Abercrombie and Fitch and worked with Bruce Weber, as well as a David's Bridal campaign. The following year, Humphries modeled for Vogue Italia, where she worked with Michel Comte. This opportunity led to her walking in New York Fashion Week in February 2014. In the winter of 2015, she returned to New York and lived in the Ford Model apartments, worked, and continued training as a dancer.

Humphries signed with LA and NY Models in 2017.

== Sexual assault case ==
In July 2021, Humphries, along with Gina Menichino, filed a complaint against Mitchell Taylor Button, husband of former Boston Ballet dancer Dusty Button, accusing him of sexually abusing her. Humphries was in an apprentice program with the Boston Ballet in 2016 when the couple allegedly "sexually and verbally abused her, forced her to live with them and isolated her from her family."

In September 2021, the federal complaint was updated, accusing the Buttons of sex trafficking and sexual abuse of seven dancers, including a minor, age 11, between 2007 and 2021. The plaintiffs include Humphries and Menichino, as well as Rosie DeAngelo and Dani X. The complaint states, "This is a case about a couple who exploited their position of power and influence in the dance world to sexually abuse young dancers across the country."

In 2022, court documents included claims of federal sex trafficking and forced labor violations against both Dusty and Taylor Button, as well as separate accusations about Taylor Button for assault, battery, false imprisonment, and sexual exploitation of a minor. The Buttons' lawyer, Marc Randazza, filed a motion to dismiss the case, denying any wrongdoing.

On July 8, 2022, Randazza "filed a third-party counterclaim in U.S. District Court in Nevada," in which they claimed having been in a consensual, "loving and supportive" relationship with Humphries. The counterclaim also includes a U.S. civil suit was filed against the Edmonton Oilers' owner, Daryl Katz, alleging he paid Humphries $75,000 for sexual favors. Katz was 53 at the time; Humphries was 17. In the counterclaim, Randazza wrote, "To the extent that Sage Humphries claims she was abused and sex trafficked, the Buttons agree — however, this abuse and trafficking was not at their hands, but at the hands of a series of older men." Randazza further claimed, "Humphries was literally a child prostitute to a billionaire, and her mother assisted her in laundering the money she was paid and in trafficking her to Katz."

Katz's lawyer, Robert Klieger, has denied the claims of sexual misconduct but admits Katz and Humphries had met in 2016 regarding Humphries's film project. Katz has confirmed he arranged to pay $75,000 toward her film. Key evidence against Katz involves screenshots of text conversations between Humphries and Katz, but the authenticity of the texts remains in question. The alleged text messages do not contain sexually explicit content but show a desire for secrecy. According to Humphries's claims, the texts would have been received while Taylor Button had control of her phone.

Humphries's lawyer, Sigrid McCawley, denied the claim against Katz and referred to the counterclaim against Katz as a "meaningless sideshow" to distract from the Button case. Less than a month later, in August 2022, the couple voluntarily withdrew their claims against Katz after being provided with reliable evidence to the contrary; their lawyer issued an apology and requested that the court strike all relevant references from the record.
