= Jürgen Schreiber (businessman) =

German-born businessman

Jürgen Schreiber (born 1962) is a German-born businessman. He was the CEO of Rexall Health Before joining Katz Group, Schreiber served for four years as president and CEO of Edcon Group, the largest non-food retailer in South Africa, with 1,400 stores and approximately 20,000 employees across Africa. Previously he was CEO and president of Shoppers Drug Mart Corp., also known as "Pharmaprix" in the Quebec province, from March 30, 2007, until his resignation on January 26, 2011. Schreiber joined Shoppers Drug Mart/Pharmaprix as its chairman and chief executive officer in June 2007. Schreiber was replaced by David M. Williams, the chairman of the board of Shoppers Drug Mart Corporation, as interim president and chief executive officer after his resignation was announced.

== Biography ==
Before joining Shoppers Drug Mart, he had a five-year career as the chief executive officer of "Health and Beauty Europe" at AS Watson, a subsidiary of Hutchison Whampoa, owner of the world's largest network of health and beauty stores. In this capacity, he was responsible for more than 4,000 stores in 23 countries. These stores, operating under 10 brands, include Superdrug (U.K.), ICI Paris XL (Benelux), Kruidvat (Netherlands and Belgium), Trekpleister (Netherlands), Savers (U.K. and Netherlands), Drogas (Latvia and Lithuania), Rossmann (Germany, Poland, Czech Republic and Hungary) and Spektr (Russia). Before joining A.S. Watson Group, Schreiber had a 14-year career with Reckitt Benckiser, where he progressed through many senior management positions in the U.K., Germany, Spain, Netherlands, China and Singapore.

Schreiber attended the University of Mannheim in Germany, where he graduated with a Master of Arts in business administration.

His reported annual compensation in 2007 at Shoppers Drug Mart was 2.7 million dollars (CAD).
