= Mister Leonard =

Canadian women's sportswear company

Mister Leonard Inc
- Type: Privately held
- Industry: Apparel (Garment)
- Founded: 1956
- Defunct: 1999
- Headquarters: Toronto, Ontario, Canada
- Key people: Sam Gertner, Leonard Wasser, Lorne Gertner, Jeffery Gertner
- Products: Sportswear
- Divisions: Pantman, Mister Leonard, Blast, Lauren Jeffries, Gary Petites

Mister Leonard was a leading Canadian women's sportswear company. It was founded in 1965, by Leonard Wasser and Sam Gertner, growing out of their previous company Pantman. Mister Leonard grew to become one of the country's leading apparel manufacturers, at its prime doing 90 million plus in annual sales, and becoming the largest garment employer in the city of Toronto, Ontario. The company also was amongst the first Canadian manufacturers to set up production in Hong Kong. A rapidly changing economic and retail environment, coupled with founder Sam Gertner's increasing health problems in the late 20th century, put a difficult strain on the company and in 1999 Sam Gertner decided to shut down the company.

== Early years ==
Mister Leonard evolved out of a previous partnership between Sam Gertner, Syd Stein, and Leonard Wasser in the Company Pantman. Pantman manufactured men's styled fly-front pants for women. A concept so foreign at the time that one confused model employed by the company famously zipped them up with the zipper on the back. In 1965, Wasser and Gertner left to form Mister Leonard, receiving their first order from Eaton's. Mister Leonard saw Gertner and Wasser branching out from manufacturing solely women's pants, to skirts, jackets, blouses and sweaters. The company split its clothing into several lines including Mister Leonard, Garey Petites, Lauren Jefferies, and Pant Man. Mister Leonard based its operation out of 431 King Street, home to its corporate office and factory. Mister Leonard goods were featured in both retail chains, including Eatons, Simpsons (department store), and Woodward's as well as independent stores across the nation. Independent stores would end up providing the company with well over 75 percent of its business, with the line doing extremely well in small towns across the country. Key to the company's growth were trade tariffs preventing competition from abroad. As well, the company thrived due to Gertner's tenacity and reputation as a tough deal maker, earning him the nickname the "Iron Fist". Prior to free trade, the company had working relationships and exchanged data with US sportswear makers Liz Claiborne, Jones Apparel Group, and Chaus. Mister Leonard also found themselves combining fabric orders with their Seventh Avenue counterparts, in order to meet minimum yardage requirements for fabric purchases.

== Peak and downfall ==
In 1978, Gertner took sole control of the company as a result of a buyout clause between him and Wasser. Many people privately took bets on how long it would take for Mister Leonard to go bankrupt under the reins of Gertner, yet, in the face of this lack of confidence the company thrived and grew to new heights. In the mid-1980s the company managed more than 50 million in sales, an impressive number considering the fact that the company solely sold its apparel domestically. The company continued its upward trajectory until 1988, when the signing of NAFTA, the beginning of the early 1990s recession, and the suffering of a stroke by Gertner halted the company's progress. As a result of Sam's stroke, his sons Lorne and Jeffery took over the company. Although the company failed to return to its peak, the Gertner brothers managed to keep the company profitable by upgrading the factory's manufacturing technology, putting together standalone soft shops, acquiring the license for Haggar Clothing, women's wear in Canada, and downaging the company's garments. In 1997, Sam Gertner took over the reins of the company again from his sons, but health problems forced him to wind down Mister Leonard in 1999.
