= David Branch (ice hockey) =

Canadian ice hockey administrator (1948–2026)

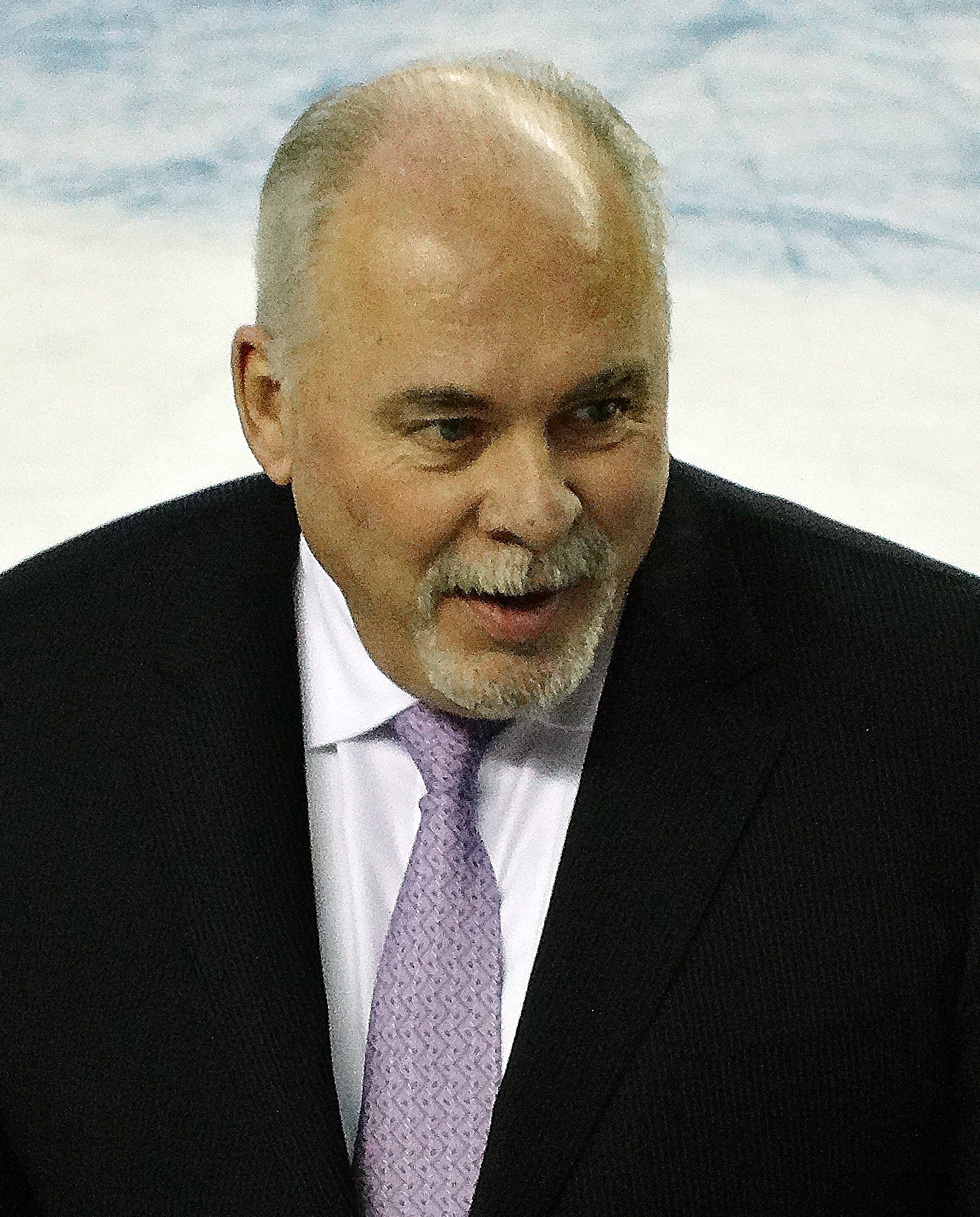
- Branch in 2014
- Born: November 27, 1948; Bathurst, New Brunswick, Canada
- Died: January 4, 2026 (aged 77)
- Education: University of Massachusetts Amherst
- Known for: Ontario Hockey League commissioner (1979–2024); Canadian Hockey League president (1996–2019)
- Awards: Order of Hockey in Canada
- Honours: David Branch Player of the Year Award

David Elliott Branch (November 27, 1948 – January 4, 2026) was a Canadian ice hockey administrator. His lengthy involvement in junior ice hockey includes serving as commissioner of the Ontario Hockey League (OHL) from 1979 to 2024, and as president of the Canadian Hockey League (CHL) from 1996 to 2019. He received the Order of Hockey in Canada in 2016, and the CHL Player of the Year award was renamed in his honour in 2019.

== Early life ==
David Elliott Branch was born on November 27, 1948, in Bathurst, New Brunswick, to parents Allie and Margaret Branch. He played NCAA hockey while attending the University of Massachusetts Amherst on a scholarship. After graduating, he moved to Whitby, Ontario, and became involved in coaching minor ice hockey with the Whitby Wildcats organization, and hockey camps run by Wren Blair and Jim Gregory.

== Executive career ==
Branch served as secretary-manager of the Ontario Hockey Association (OHA) from 1973 to 1977, succeeding Bill Hanley. Originally the only paid OHA staff in 1973, he was joined in 1975 by Brent Ladds who then succeeded Branch in 1977. Hired by Gord Renwick in 1977, Branch became the new executive director of the Canadian Amateur Hockey Association for the retiring Gordon Juckes. He served in that role until 1979.

Branch played a role in the founding of the Ontario Hockey League (OHL), by negotiating with Brent Ladds to split the Ontario Major Junior Hockey League (OMJHL) from the OHA. He became commissioner of the OMJHL in 1979, and the independent OHL in 1980. He became president of the Canadian Hockey League (CHL) in 1996, and brought its three leagues closer together when they had previously been adversaries. He helped develop a scholarship program that affords all players one year of post-secondary education per season played in the league. He advocated for safety and implemented a "Players First" policy for concussions.

In the OHL, Branch implemented rules to reduce fighting. Fighting had been unlimited when he began as OHL commissioner, which he fought for rule changes to suspend players after four fights. He was part of introducing a blindside hit rule in the OHL, and aimed to have all members of the CHL introduce similar rules. He supported mental health initiatives for players, and helped create Hockey Canada's Program of Excellence allowing junior players to compete in international events. In 2005, he implemented the exceptional player status clause, allowing a 14-year-old John Tavares to be drafted one year sooner than normal.

Dan MacKenzie succeeded Branch as the CHL president in September 2019, while Branch continued as the OHL commissioner. Branch continued as OHL commissioner until his retirement on August 6, 2024, when he was succeeded by Golf Canada executive Bryan Crawford.

== Personal life and death ==
Branch was married with three sons and two stepchildren. Each of his sons were involved in ice hockey. Barclay served as a general manager in the OHL, and was an assistant coach with the Oshawa Generals. Kyle was drafted by the Mississauga IceDogs in 1999. Wade briefly played in the Ontario Provincial Junior Hockey League with the Bowmanville Eagles.

Branch was involved in hockey twelve months per year, became a recreational golfer later in life, and supported the Toronto Blue Jays. He was a long-time resident of Whitby, Ontario. He died on January 4, 2026, at age 77. A public memorial was held at the Tribute Communities Centre in Oshawa.

== Honours and legacy ==
Branch was a member of the Hockey Hall of Fame selection committee. He was honoured with the Order of Hockey in Canada in 2016, and he was inducted into the Whitby Sports Hall of Fame as a builder in 2017. After retiring as CHL president in 2019, the CHL Player of the Year Award was renamed for Branch. In 2025, the OHL established the David Branch Leader of the Year Award to recognize a team executive.

Junior hockey executive Sherwood Bassin felt that, "everything [Branch] did was for the betterment of the game", and "the integrity of the league was very important". National Hockey League (NHL) commissioner Gary Bettman credited Branch with "growing hockey at all levels" and "modernization for the leagues that have long been the greatest source of players who make the NHL".

== Bibliography ==
- Young, Scott (1989). 100 Years of Dropping the Puck. Toronto, Ontario, Canada: McClelland & Stewart. ISBN 0-7710-9093-5.
