= Charles Tator =

Canadian physician (born 1936)

Charles H. Tator OC (born August 24, 1936) is a Canadian physician.

Born in Toronto, he studied medicine at the University of Toronto. He interned at the Toronto General Hospital and returned to graduate studies in the neuropathology division at the University of Toronto, completing an MA and PhD and continuing his training in neurosurgery. In 1969, Tator became a fellow in the Royal College of Physicians and Surgeons of Canada in Neurosurgery. In the same year, he became an assistant professor at the university and he became a Professor in 1980. He was head of the neurosurgery division at Sunnybrook Health Sciences Centre and served as director of the Toronto Hospital Neurosciences Centre from 1983 to 1988. From 1990 to 1999, he was associate director of the Playfair Neuroscience Unit at the Toronto Hospital and he was chairman of the neurosurgery division at the University of Toronto from 1989 to 1999.

Tator's primary area of research was spinal cord injury, including injury prevention, especially in sports and recreation, and treatment. In 1992 he founded Think First Canada/Penser d'Abord, an injury prevention foundation, and served as its president until 2007. In July 2012, Think First Canada/Penser d'Abord was amalgamated with three other organizations (Safe Communities Canada, Safe Kids Canada and SMARTRISK), to form Parachute, a national, charitable organization. Tator has been a member of Parachute's Board of Directors since its inception. 2013, he published Concussions and their consequences: current diagnosis, management and prevention.

Tator was awarded on October 21, 1999 and invested on April 26, 2000 as a Member of the Order of Canada. He was awarded on November 18, 2016 and invested on November 17, 2017 with a promotion within the order, to Officer of the Order of Canada. He was named to the Canadian Medical Hall of Fame in 2009. In 2003, he was inducted into the Terry Fox Hall of Fame. On November 9, 2017, Tator was awarded the Order of Sport, marking his induction into Canada's Sports Hall of Fame. He received the Order of Hockey in Canada in 2020.
