= Chuck Rifici =

Canadian entrepreneur and politician (born 1974)

- Born: November 16, 1974 (age 52); Ottawa, Ontario, Canada
- Education: MBA, Queen's University, 2005; B.A.Sc., Computer Engineering, University of Ottawa, 2002
- Alma mater: University of Ottawa; Queen's University
- Occupations: Founder of Tweed Marijuana Inc; CFO of Liberal Party of Canada

Chuck Rifici (born Charles Orifici) is a Canadian entrepreneur, former CEO of Tweed Marijuana Inc, and former CFO of the Liberal Party of Canada. He has been tagged "the godfather of Canadian weed".

== Background ==
Chuck Rifici got an MBA from Queen's University. He launched a software startup as a second-year engineering student at the University of Ottawa. Rifici served as CFO of Select Start Studios, Marchwell Ventures Ltd, Impatica Inc, and of Cybersurf Corp.

In 2011, Rifici was appointed CFO of Liberal Party of Canada by interim party leader Bob Rae, an appointment upheld by incoming Liberal leader Justin Trudeau. He is currently CEO of Nesta Holding Co., a private equity firm that invests in the cannabis industry. He is also a Chartered Professional Accountant.

In 2013, Rifici and Bruce Linton founded Tweed Marijuana Inc. They acquired a large manufacturing plant in Smiths Falls, got listed on the TSX Venture Exchange, and rose $24 million from investors. Rifici owned 70% of the company' s shares The company grew from 0 to 80 employees in 8 months.

Tweed Inc. went public on 4 April 2014 and became Canada's biggest full-scale producer of government-sanctioned cannabis. Later in 2014, Rifici stepped-down as Tweed's CEO; some news articles indicate that he was ousted by the Board. He was subsequently replaced by Linton, and the company was renamed Canopy Growth Corporation in September 2015. Chuck Rifici remained the company's largest stockholder, and sued Tweed for wrongful dismissal. He asked for a 12-month instead of the 4 he received, and $100K for "mental distress". In 2016, Tweed inc. replied that Rifici was dismissed because he consistently missed milestones in the renovation of the Smiths Falls facilities, and that the company was on its way to insolvency

In 2015, Rifici started a new company with a plan to invest in various aspects of the cannabis industry. Nesta Holding Co. has invested in 15 companies. He also joined the board of three marijuana-producing companies that combined a market value of $13 billion, from resigned from all three boards in May 2017 to run Auxly Cannabis Group, formerly Cannabis Wheaton, a platform to invest in marijuana entrepreneurs.

In October 2015, after the Canadian government announced its intention to legalize recreational cannabis, Rifici's value of his shares in Canopy gained 25% instantly. He denied any causal effect between his business and his ties with the Canadian government. He also declared that he started to unload his Canopy shares since that month, selling the last stock in May 2017. In February 2017 he sued Rona Ambrose, Alexander Nuttall and Blaine Calkins after they tweeted innuendos around the Canopy Growth’s share price surge in late May 2016.

By January 2018, the value of his investment portofolio reached $115 million. In October 2018, he committed $25k to fight drug-impaired driving laws.

== Awards ==
- 2014: Top Forty under 40 by Ottawa Business Journal
- 2014: Alumnus of the year by the University of Ottawa faculty of engineering
- 2014: Exceptional new business award by the Ottawa Chamber of Commerce
