= Acreage Holdings =

US Cannabis company

- Type: Public
- Traded as: CSE: ACRG.U
- Industry: Cannabis, Medical marijuana
- Founded: 2011; 15 years ago in Maine
- Headquarters: New York, NY, United States
- Website: acreageholdings.com

Acreage Holdings (formerly known as High Street Capital Partners) is a public company domiciled in British Columbia, Canada, holding a portfolio of cannabis cultivation, processing and dispensing operations in the United States.

== History ==
Acreage Holdings was founded in Maine in 2011.

== Ownership ==
Members of Acreage Holdings' Board of Directors include former Republican Congressman and Speaker of the United States House of Representatives John Boehner, former libertarian Republican Governor of Massachusetts Bill Weld, former IBM Chief Financial Officer Douglas Maine, and former Conservative Prime Minister of Canada Brian Mulroney.

Although several of the board members have stated that they joined the board because of the medical uses for cannabis (Boehner specifically cited the potential of medical marijuana to limit the opioid epidemic,) the company is investing in operations serving recreational as well as medical use of cannabis. In late 2018, Acreage Holdings acquired Michigan-based Blue Tire Holdings LLC. Acreage CEO Kevin Murphy expects additional American states to transition from medical use only to medical and recreational use. Murphy stated in a Bloomberg interview that the November 2018 U.S. mid-term elections were very helpful to the industry, both because of the people who were elected to office and because some incumbent opponents of marijuana legislation were voted out.

== Holdings ==
Acreage had its initial public offering in November 2018, beginning trading on the Canadian Securities Exchange. By the following April, it was one of the largest US-based cannabis companies, with licenses or agreements for cultivation, processing and dispensing in nineteen states, as well as its own chain of retail stores, The Botanist.

Acreage holdings entered the Massachusetts market by creating controlled companies to in effect hold and operate more than the 3 license limit. Then acted to create a regional noncompete monopoly with the companies Seahunter and American.

In the same month, Canopy Growth, a firm with headquarters in Smiths Falls, Ontario and the largest cannabis company in the world, concluded an agreement with Acreage to buy 100% of the latter's shares for US$3.4 billion. The sale would be concluded in future, and only if the American federal government legalizes cannabis. In the meantime, Canopy would pay US$300 million to seal the deal. In an interview with The Canadian Press, Vivien Azer, senior research analyst with Cowen, said that Acreage was a suitable acquisition target because it had the greatest market penetration in the U.S. and believed that the deal would "likely prove helpful in pushing for a change in U.S. laws surrounding cannabis".

== Facilities ==
Acreage purchased a former industrial facility in Sanderson, Florida, and set up a test cultivation and processing facility with the intent to expand to a warehouse on the site.

The facility was sold to Red White & Bloom in Feb 2021.
