= Drug Emporium =

Defunct pharmacy corporation

- Type: Private
- Industry: Retail
- Founded: 1977
- Defunct: 2003 (corporate-owned stores)
- Fate: Bankruptcy; limited continuation of brand name in the United States
- Headquarters: Longview, Texas
- Products: Groceries, Pharmacy, Pro hair Products, Cosmetics, Health Food Store, Home Health, DME Products.
- Website: TX, LA, AR locations: https://www.drugemporiuminc.com

Drug Emporium is the name of a discount drug store corporation, founded in 1977 in Columbus, Ohio, that was sold to several different buyers during 2000 to 2001. Although several store locations continue to use the Drug Emporium name, these locations are no longer affiliated with the now-defunct Columbus-based corporation. At the company's high water mark in the 1990s, there were almost 300 locations scattered throughout the United States, including stores that operated under the F&M and VIX banners.

The company declared bankruptcy in April 2001 as a condition of its sale to Snyder Drug of Minneapolis, Minnesota. Various causes have been attributed, with most citing the company's failure to effectively compete with Walgreens, CVS Corporation and other drug store chains. Additionally, much time, effort and money was spent attempting to leverage the power of the brick and mortar Drug Emporium locations into the failed DrugEmporium.com website that was seen as the company's future. This "click and mortar" approach, typical of the pre-dot-com bubble mentality of the late 1990s, never fully materialized and served only to deepen the company's economic troubles.

The large base of franchised Texas and West Virginia locations, along with company-owned California locations were sold off and a single location in Lafayette, Louisiana, to independent owners. Then, on September 12, 2003, Snyder Drug closed all of the remaining corporate-owned stores in Pennsylvania, New Jersey, New York, Michigan, Ohio, Missouri, Oklahoma, Kentucky, and Wisconsin due to significant capital infusions and to escape bankruptcy. Although the chain was founded in Columbus, Ohio, it no longer has stores in its home state. Snyder Drug was owned by the Katz Group of Edmonton, Alberta, Canada until its sale to Walgreens in 2010.

A former Drug Emporium franchisee operates the remaining stores. Longview, Texas-based Gibson Sales, L.P., operates a group of nine stores throughout markets in central and northern Texas; Lafayette and Shreveport, in Louisiana; and Little Rock, Arkansas. The new concept Drug Emporiums feature a health food store within each store.

Since 2003 Drug Emporium TV ads have featured a bear dancing to the song "Walk the Dinosaur" by Was (Not Was). The Recording Workshop – RECW continues to use a commercial from the 1980s for one of its sound-for-picture classes. Students are instructed to place several sound effects into the commercial, as well as one student doing a voiceover.

In August 2019, Drug Emporium Lubbock hosted a grand re-opening after the renovation and expansion of several of their departments in Texas. In July 2025, Discount Emporium Inc. closed the three remaining West Virginia-owned stores located in Barboursville and Charleston.
