= Katz Group of Companies =

Canadian business firm

- Type: Private
- Industry: Sports & entertainment; Real estate development
- Founded: 1990; 36 years ago, in Edmonton, Alberta
- Founder: Daryl Katz
- Headquarters: Edmonton, Alberta, Canada
- Key people: Daryl Katz (chairman)
- Owner: Daryl Katz
- Subsidiaries: OEG Inc. Katz Group Properties
- Website: www.katzgroup.ca

The Katz Group of Companies is a Canadian privately owned enterprise, with operations in sports and entertainment and real estate development. OEG Inc., a subsidiary of the Katz Group, owns the National Hockey League five-time Stanley Cup Champion Edmonton Oilers, as well as professional hockey franchises in the American Hockey League, Western Hockey League, and ECHL, and Aquila Productions, an entertainment and event company. OEG operates Rogers Place in downtown Edmonton. Katz Group is also involved in land assembly, site, and building development in Canada and the United States, including the design and development of Ice District, an area that encompasses more than 25 acres anchored by Rogers Place. Katz Group is based in Edmonton, Alberta. Its founder and chairman is Daryl Katz.

Katz Group had some history in the pharmacy business from 1991 until 2016 when it sold its remaining pharmacy interests including the Rexall Drugstore brand and stores to American pharmacy giant McKesson Corporation.

== Rexall Health ==
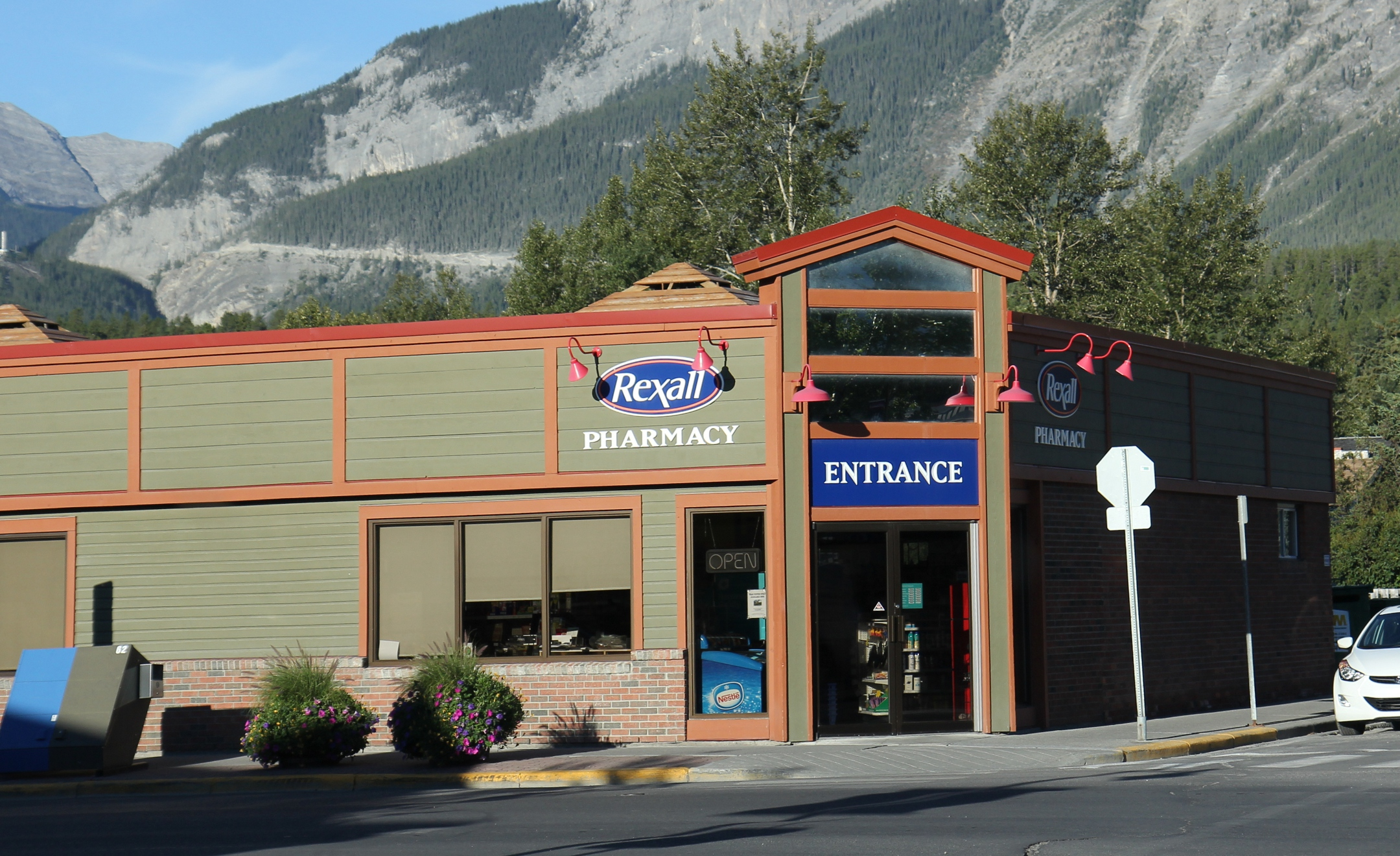
The Rexall Pharmacy in Canmore, Alberta

Katz Group’s former pharmacy business and health-related companies operated under the banner "Rexall Health". Rexall Health included these independently operated businesses:

- Rexall/Rexall Pharma Plus, a retail pharmacy chain operating under the 100-year-old Rexall banner. The chain employs over 8,600 people at more than 460 locations across Canada
- Medicentres Canada, a group of family health care clinics where family physicians and specialists provide health care services to people in Edmonton, Calgary, London, and Windsor
- Claimsecure Inc., a healthcare management and technology firm that provides customized health benefit claims management and plan administrative services to Canadian corporations and other health benefit plan sponsors

In March 2016, Katz sold Rexall to McKesson Corporation for C$3 billion.

== History of pharmacy business ==
In 1991, in a partnership with his father Barry Katz, Daryl Katz paid $300,000 for the Canadian rights to the U.S.-based Medicine Shoppe drugstore franchise, which had over 1,000 stores in the USA. His father was a pharmacist who founded the Value Drug Mart chain in Edmonton in 1978. Katz obtained financing from Vencap Equities, a venture capital fund established by the Alberta government to support local entrepreneurs. Daryl later stated: "If my father wasn't in the business and didn't have a history, I would never have succeeded in getting it."

In 1992, Katz Group opened the first Medicine Shoppe store. In 1996, it purchased the fading Rexall drugstore chain in Canada which at the time only consisted of several dozen stores. Six years after the first Medicine Shoppe was opened, Katz Group’s pharmacy operation consisted of 80 Rexall stores, 30 Medicine Shoppe outlets, and a few smaller independent retailers. In 1997, it purchased the Ontario-based, 143-store Pharma Plus drugstore chain from the supermarket operator Oshawa Group for $100 million.

In 1999, it ventured into the U.S. with the purchase of the money-losing Minnesota-based Snyders Drug Store chain, which had $300 million in sales. In 2001, it purchased the U.S.-based Drug Emporium big-box discount chain. The Snyder's chain filed for bankruptcy in 2003 and its 25 stores were sold to Walgreens.

On January 30, 2012, Katz agreed to sell its Drug Trading Company Ltd. to McKesson Corporation for roughly $920 million in cash. Drug Trading Company is a marketing and purchasing arm for a network of over 850 independent pharmacies that primarily operate under the I.D.A. and Guardian brands and Medicine Shoppe Canada Inc. The sale represented about 90% of the Katz Group's assets, shrinking the group's network of corporate-owned and franchised stores to 450 Rexall/Rexall Pharma Plus stores. Additionally on January 30, 2012, Katz acquired the 18-store Dell Pharmacies chain that operates in the Hamilton, Ontario, area. Dell joined the Rexall chain effective with the announcement.

Regarding the deal, National Bank Financial analyst Vishal Shreedhar suggested, "... Katz Group wants to exit the small pharmacy-focused independent/franchise business because it is most impacted by recent drug reforms. In contrast, Katz Group’s corporate store business ([about] 420 stores) benefits from stronger brand awareness, greater front store penetration, and superior vendor support, making it a better growth platform." Katz Group continues to supply Rexall products to the independent and franchise pharmacies sold to McKesson.

On March 2, 2016, Rexall announced that it was being sold, in entirety, by Katz Group to the McKesson Corporation, a San Francisco-based pharmaceutical company. It has been speculated that this is due to pressure on McKesson by Walgreens over the Rite Aid purchase, and on growing pressure on Rexall over sales. The deal was finalized in December 2016 following approval received under the Investment Canada Act.

== Purchase of Edmonton Oilers ==
In May 2007, Katz made a $145-million bid to buy the Edmonton Oilers NHL hockey team, which the owners of the team, the Edmonton Investors Group (EIG), quickly rejected, stating the team was not for sale.

In July 2007, he made another bid for the Oilers of $185 million, which was turned down by the EIG on August 7, 2007. On December 12, 2007, Katz made an offer of $188 million to the EIG. The board of the EIG announced in January 2008 that it would again recommend to its shareholders to reject this latest bid.

On January 28, 2008, Katz increased his offer to $200 million and extended the acceptance deadline to February 5, 2008, at which time Katz was notified by the EIG that all its members agreed to sell the Oilers to him, pending league and financial approval. On June 18, 2008, Daryl Katz received the final approval from the National Hockey League to purchase the Edmonton Oilers, and then on July 2, 2008, he was announced as the owner of the Edmonton Oilers during a press conference at Rexall Place, where he was presented with an Edmonton Oilers jersey with the number "08" and his last name patched onto the back.

Katz created the Rexall Sports Corporation to run the sports and entertainment side of the Katz Group. It was renamed Oilers Entertainment Group (OEG) in 2014. In addition to the Oilers, OEG owns and operates the Edmonton Oil Kings (WHL), the Bakersfield Condors (AHL), and Aquila Productions (film & production company).

In April 2015, Katz announced a partnership with Joel Silver to create Silver Pictures Entertainment – a new company that will develop, produce, and provide or arrange financing for feature films, television, and digital projects. Katz’ interests in the company fall under the OEG umbrella.

OEG also operates Rogers Place, a multi-use indoor arena that is home to both the Edmonton Oilers and the Edmonton Oil Kings. Rogers Place opened in downtown Edmonton in the fall of 2016. In addition to sporting events, the arena plays host to concerts and other events in the Ice District, a mixed-use sports and entertainment development. In 2019, Rogers Place was awarded the gold standard for exemplary architecture by the International Olympic and Paralympic Committees.

In 2020, in response to the COVID-19 pandemic, the City of Edmonton, along with Toronto, was selected as one of two NHL hub cities to facilitate the completion of the 2019–2020 season.

== Real estate development ==
Katz Group Properties is involved in land assembly and site and building development across Canada and the United States, and is leading the $2.5 billion Edmonton Arena District development now known as Ice District.

=== Rogers Place and Ice District ===
Shortly after acquiring the Oilers in 2008, Katz set his sights on building a new arena in downtown Edmonton, which he anticipated would be a catalyst for downtown revitalization. Following public consultations and negotiations with the City of Edmonton, Katz Group and the city agreed to a public-private partnership to build Rogers Place arena, under which the city would retain ownership of the new arena, and Katz Group operate it (under OEG). The city’s portion of arena funding will be paid through a Community Revitalization Levy and will not result in any new cost to taxpayers. Construction on the project began in March 2014 and was completed in fall 2016. It features a 24,000-square-foot grand entrance-way called "Ford Hall" which is used as a public/private programmable space.

With Rogers Place at its core, Katz Group began construction of the Edmonton Arena District (EAD), one of Canada’s largest mixed-use sports and entertainment development. The EAD covers 25 contiguous acres of downtown Edmonton and features a 50,000-square-foot public plaza, two office towers, a JW Marriott hotel, a Gateway Casinos gaming and entertainment facility, a Cineplex movie theatre complex, over 1,000 luxury condos and rental apartments, and 270,000 square feet of retail space at a total cost around $2.5 billion. In 2014, it was announced that the City of Edmonton and Stantec would be the major tenants of the two office towers. Stantec Tower is the tallest in Edmonton (66 stories).

On July 13, 2015, it was announced that the Edmonton Arena District would be called Ice District. Ice District is accessible via the Edmonton LRT MacEwan station on the Metro Line. It is located across from MacEwan University on 105 Avenue between 103 and 104 Street. The station opened on September 6, 2015.
