= Canopy Growth =

Canadian marijuana company

Canopy Growth Corporation
- Type: Medical marijuana and, in Canada, recreational marijuana
- Traded as: TSX: WEED; Nasdaq: CGC
- ISIN: CA1380351009
- Industry: Cannabis
- Predecessor: Tweed Marijuana Inc. Bedrocan Canada Inc.
- Founded: 2013
- Founders: Bruce Linton, Mark Zekulin, Chuck Rifici
- Headquarters: Smiths Falls, Ontario, Canada
- Area served: Worldwide
- Products: Medical cannabis, recreational cannabis
- Revenue: ▼CA$297.15 million (2024)
- Net income: ▲CA$ -657.27 million (2024)
- Total assets: ▼CA$1.30 billion (2024)
- Total equity: ▼CA$500.51 million (2024)
- Number of employees: 1,029 (2024)
- Website: www.canopygrowth.com www.tweed.com www.spectrumcannabis.ca

Canopy Growth Corporation, formerly Tweed Marijuana Inc., is a Canadian cannabis company based in Smiths Falls, Ontario.

In April 2019, Canopy was the world's largest cannabis company based on the value of all shares or market capitalization. At that time, Constellation Brands Inc. controlled over 35% percent of the company which had approximately 3,200 employees. The year 2019 created new challenges for the company however, with its stock price dropping by about 32%. In the next two years (to the end of 2021) its shares dropped an additional 55%. In September 2022, the company announced divestiture of its Canadian retail operations, selling its 28 retails stores across the country to other cannabis companies.

== History ==
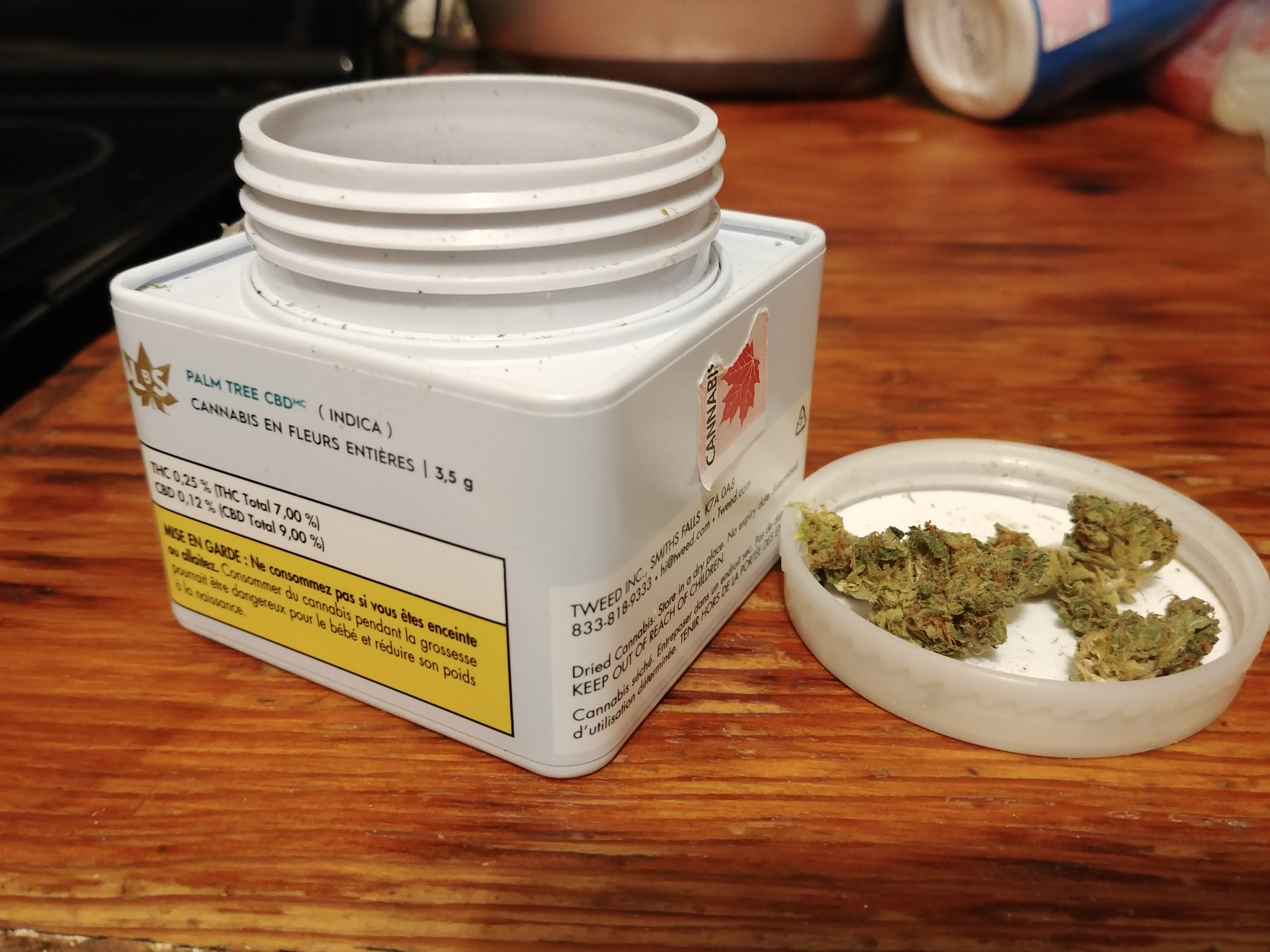
Tweed branded cannabis as sold in Alberta

Tweed was founded by Bruce Linton and Chuck Rifici in 2013, and renamed Canopy Growth Corporation in 2015 after a merger with Bedrocan Canada.

Bruce Linton was the primary Founder, Chairman and Co-CEO and Mark Zekulin was Co-CEO and President until July 3, 2019, when Linton was ousted from the company. Zekulin became the sole CEO, until later that year a new CEO was announced and Zekulin stepped down on 20 December.

Canopy Growth was the first federally regulated, licensed, publicly traded cannabis producer in North America, traded on the Toronto Stock Exchange as WEED. It began trading as CGC on the New York Stock Exchange on May 24, 2018, as the first cannabis producer on the NYSE. On October 17, 2018, marijuana became legal in Canada for recreational use. Canada's first legal cannabis sale was made at midnight by CEO Bruce Linton at a Tweed store in St. John's, Newfoundland and Labrador.

Prior to that date, cannabis was legal only for medical purposes in Canada; growers were licensed by Health Canada under the Access to Cannabis for Medical Purposes Regulations (ACMPR). The company was described as "Canada's first cannabis unicorn with a $1 billion dollar valuation" by the Financial Post news organization in November 2016. The company was renamed to Canopy Growth Corp. in September 2015 with two established brands: Tweed Inc. and Bedrocan Canada Corp. Specifically, CGC is the parent company of licensed cannabis producers Tweed Inc., Tweed Farms Inc., Spectrum Cannabis., as well as newly acquired companies.

Tweed operates out of the former Hershey's chocolate factory in Smiths Falls, Ontario, and operates the Tweed Farms greenhouse in Niagara-on-the-Lake.

In provinces where the private sector is allowed to sell cannabis, the company has opened retail stores via its subsidiary Tweed Inc. As of April 2019, Tweed stores were open in Manitoba, Newfoundland and Labrador, and Saskatchewan. Canopy Growth has opened cannabis stores in Manitoba and Ontario under the Tokyo Smoke brand.

In June 2018, Canopy Growth funded Professorships in Cannabis Science at the University of British Columbia in Vancouver, in conjunction with the British Columbia Centre on Substance Use (BCCSU). By October 5, 2018, the company's market capitalization exceeded US$14 billion and Linton was named 2018 CEO of the Year by the Ottawa Board of Trade and Ottawa Business Journal.

=== Partnership with Constellation Brands ===
In August 2018, Constellation Brands – an American beer, wine and spirits producer with global markets – announced its investment of an additional Can$5 billion (US$3.8 billion) in Canopy Growth, giving it 38% ownership of the company, up from the previous 10%. President Bruce Linton said the additional funds would be used for international expansion wherever federal laws allow it. Future marketing plans include products such as cannabis-infused beverages and sleep aids. After the Constellation deal was announced, the market value of Canopy Growth rose to nearly US$12 billion. At the end of 2019, when the Canadian cannabis market had declined over the second half of the year, Constellation Brands announced there were no plans to invest further in Canopy Growth, although long-term plans to develop drinkable cannabis products for medical and recreational markets remained in place.

=== 2019 restructuring ===
News reports indicated that Bruce Linton had been ousted from all of his roles with Canopy Growth and Canopy Rivers, its venture capital division, on July 2, 2019, after an emergency board meeting.

This move came a few days after Constellation Brands, which then held four of the seven Canopy board seats and controlled nearly 40% of the firm, expressed dissatisfaction with the cannabis giant's financial results. (By that time, CFO Tim Saunders had been replaced.) Significant losses had been reported during its efforts to increase the size of greenhouse facilities in British Columbia and Quebec. The fourth quarter 2018 loss had been much greater than expected, with a net loss attributable to shareholders of $335.6 million, substantially higher than the net loss that had been predicted by analysts. A CTV News report summarized the situation as: "the cannabis company's expenses ballooned, its net loss widened and medical and recreational sales activity slowed from the previous quarter". Constellation Brands president and CEO Bill Newlands made this comment in late June 2019: "... we continue to aggressively support Canopy on a more focused, long-term strategy to win markets and form factors that matter while paving a clear path to profitability".

The board left Mark Zekulin to continue as sole CEO and a search was to be conducted for a replacement co-CEO. Rade Kovacevic was named President and John Bell was appointed chairman. As of early July 2019, Linton held 18 million shares of Canopy. In an interview, he told CNBC that he had been "terminated", not "stepped down" as previous reports had suggested. "I was asked to leave, and I left under the terms that we mutually agreed to", he explained.

A mid-November 2019 report said that the company's stock "slid more than 17% Thursday ... after the company posted weaker-than-expected earnings for its fiscal second quarter". By that time, cannabis stocks in general had "crumbled to their lowest level since 2017" according to an October 2019 report.

On 9 December 2019, the company announced a new CEO, David Klein, previously executive vice president and chief financial officer at Constellation Brands and Canopy Growth's chair. (By that time, Canopy's stock had dropped 32% since the start of 2019). Interim CEO and co-founder Mark Zekulin was to step down before year end; Klein was to assume his new role on 14 January 2020. One news report stated that the appointment of Klein would further entrench Constellation’s influence on Canopy Growth.

In December 2020, the company announced that it will close some sites in Canada which can affect the jobs of 220 employees.

== Overseas operations ==
In addition to operations in Canada, Canopy Growth has a partnership agreement in Spain with pharma company Alcaliber S.A., owns a subsidiary in Germany that imports medical cannabis, Spectrum Therapeutics GmbH, and has a partnership with Spectrum Cannabis Denmark ApS, a medical cannabis grower. The company is also involved in the business in Jamaica, Chile, Peru and Brazil, as well as in Australia. In 2018, the company acquired Annabis Medical, a distributor in the Czech Republic, and medical marijuana supplier Daddy Cann Lesotho in Africa. In February 2019 Canopy set up a partnership with the Beckley Foundation to distribute medical cannabis in the UK.

== Expansion ==
Subsequent acquisitions for this corporation included Vert Medical, the German cannabis distributor MedCann (now Spectrum Therapeutics) and a majority interest in Quebec's Groupe H.E.M.P.CA Inc. In early December 2016, Canopy Growth Corp. announced a friendly takeover bid of another licensed Ontario-based producer, Mettrum Health (CVE:MT). The deal, pending the approval of Mettrum's board, was closed in January 2017.

In addition to sales in the domestic market, Canopy Growth began selling medical cannabis products in Germany and Brazil in 2016. However, the company was operating at a loss, presumably because of the significant expenditures it was making to acquire competitors in preparation for significantly increased cannabis demand by the recreational use market expected to commence in 2018. Legislation to legalize cannabis for recreational use was approved by the House of Commons of Canada in November 2017; the Senate of Canada was expected to vote on the Cannabis Act (Bill C-45) on June 7, 2018. Actual sales to casual users was likely to commence in January 2018. In January 2019, Canopy Growth announced that it was granted a license by New York State to process and produce hemp in the United States.

On January 27, 2017, Canopy and Mettrum Health Corp. announced the takeover of Mettrum by Canopy. The deal was awaiting approval by the Ontario Superior Court of Justice. At around the same time the deal had closed, Canopy completed the purchase of the entire former Hershey's chocolate factory, adding 50 percent more production space at that location. The takeover of Mettrum has resulted in "the creation of a world-leading diversified cannabis company with six licensed facilities and a licensed production footprint of approximately 665,000 sq. ft. with significant acreage for expansion".

In February 2018, Canopy Growth Corporation and Sunniva Inc., a North American provider of medical cannabis, announced a supply agreement. Sunniva's Canadian subsidiary, Sunniva Medical Inc., committed to selling Canopy 45,000 kilograms of premium quality cannabis annually for a two-year period commencing in the first quarter of 2019.

Expansion into Europe continued in April 2019 with the acquisition of licensed cannabis producer Cáñamo y Fibras Naturales, S.L. which is based in Spain. By that time, the Company already owned a licensed production site in Odense, Denmark, as well as the Storz and Bickel facility in Tuttlingen, Germany.

A tentative expansion step into the US market was also made in April 2019. The company concluded a deal to pay US$300-million for the right to buy cannabis company Acreage Holdings Inc. a company located in British Columbia but with a diverse portfolio of cannabis cultivation, processing and dispensing operations in the US. No actual purchase was made, but the agreement states that Canopy will buy 100% of Acreage shares for US$3.4 billion if the American federal government legalizes cannabis. In an interview with The Canadian Press, Vivien Azer, senior research analyst with Cowen, said that Acreage was a suitable acquisition target because it had the greatest market penetration in the U.S. and believed that the deal would "likely prove helpful in pushing for a change in U.S. laws surrounding cannabis".

=== Hiku Brands ===
Hiku was a recreational and medical cannabis company based in Toronto, Ontario and Kelowna, British Columbia which was acquired by Canopy Growth Corp. on July 10, 2018. Hiku's subsidiaries included Tokyo Smoke, DOJA, Van der Pop and Maïtri.

Hiku formed as a result of a merger between DOJA Cannabis Company and Tokyo Smoke in December 2017, and later through the additions of Maitri Group and TS Brandco Holdings. Hiku Brands officially became ‘Tokyo Smoke Brands’ in March 2019. On July 10, 2018, cannabis producer Canopy Growth Corp. announced the acquisition of Hiku Brands Ltd., including their portfolio brands consisting of licensed producer DOJA, women-focused Van der Pop, Quebec-based Maïtri and retail chain Tokyo Smoke.

- Hiku Brands (2018)
  - - - - TS Brandco Holdings Inc (2017)
    - Maitri Group Inc (2018)
  - - Hiku Brands Company Ltd.
      - - DOJA Cannabis Company (2017)
        - Tokyo Smoke (2017)
        - Van der Pop (2017)

=== Edibles ===
In November 2019, the company announced the release of retail edible cannabis products, including THC- and CBD-infused beverages and chocolates.
