= List of heliports in Norway =

Airports designed for helicopter use in Norway

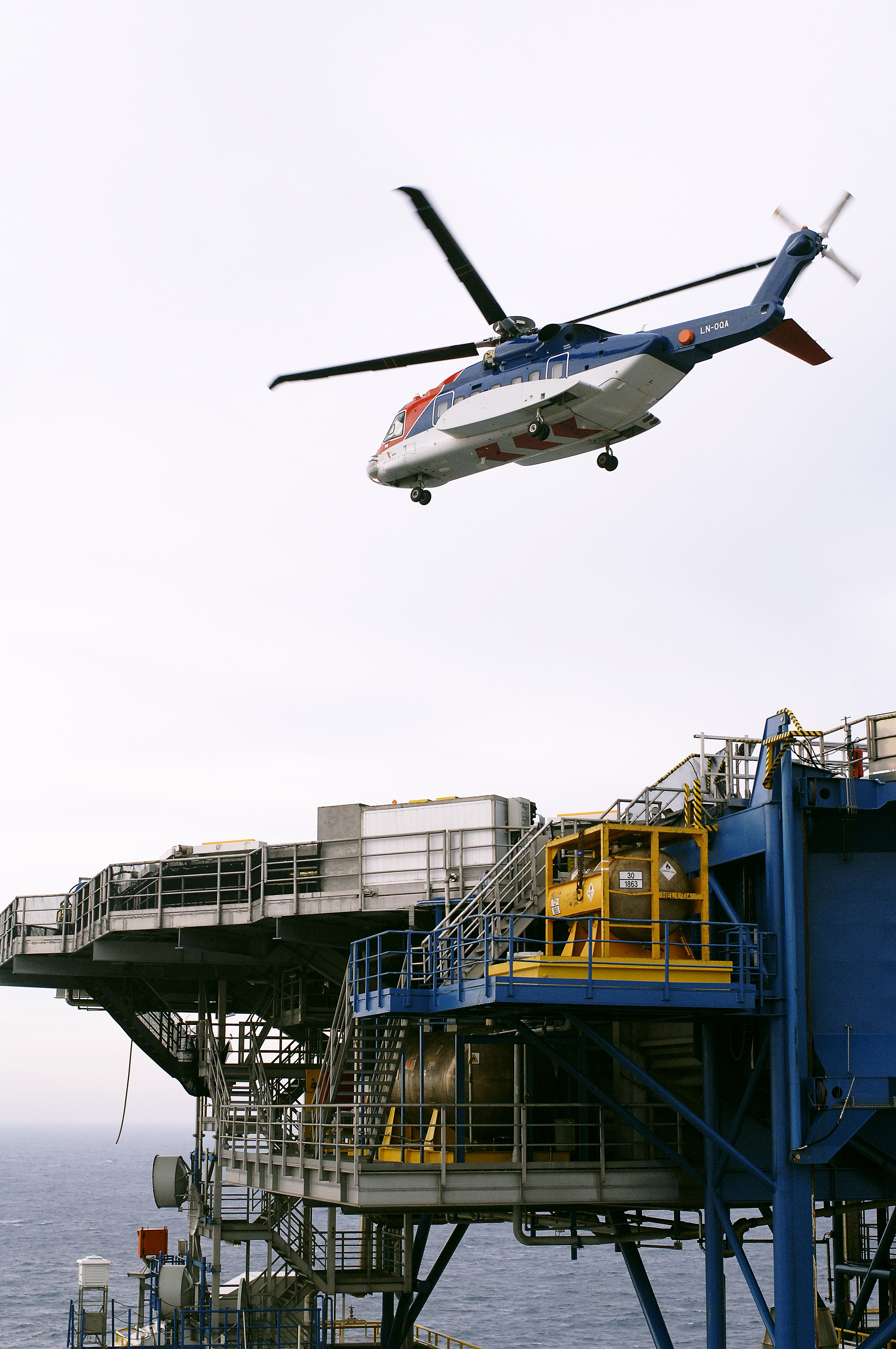
CHC Helikopter Service Sikorsky S-92 landing on the helideck on Oseberg

There are three main categories of heliports in Norway. Most land-based heliports are built in conjunction with or at hospitals. They are owned and operated by the respective hospital trust and are served by the Norwegian Air Ambulance. A second major group are offshore oil platforms and other installations related to the petroleum industry. These are owned and operated by the oil or gas field operator. The third-category are general-purpose heliports. These are often owned by helicopter operating companies.

Norwegian legislation requires that all heliports permanent heliports and helipads which have an average twelve or more weekly aircraft movements gave approval from the Civil Aviation Authority of Norway (CAA). Exceptions include offshore and ship-mounted helipads and those situated in Svalbard. However, offshore helipads are required to meet a set of regulations. The situation on Svalbard is made complicated due to the Svalbard Treaty. Norwegian authorities therefore do not require permits for construction of heliports and helipads on the archipelago.

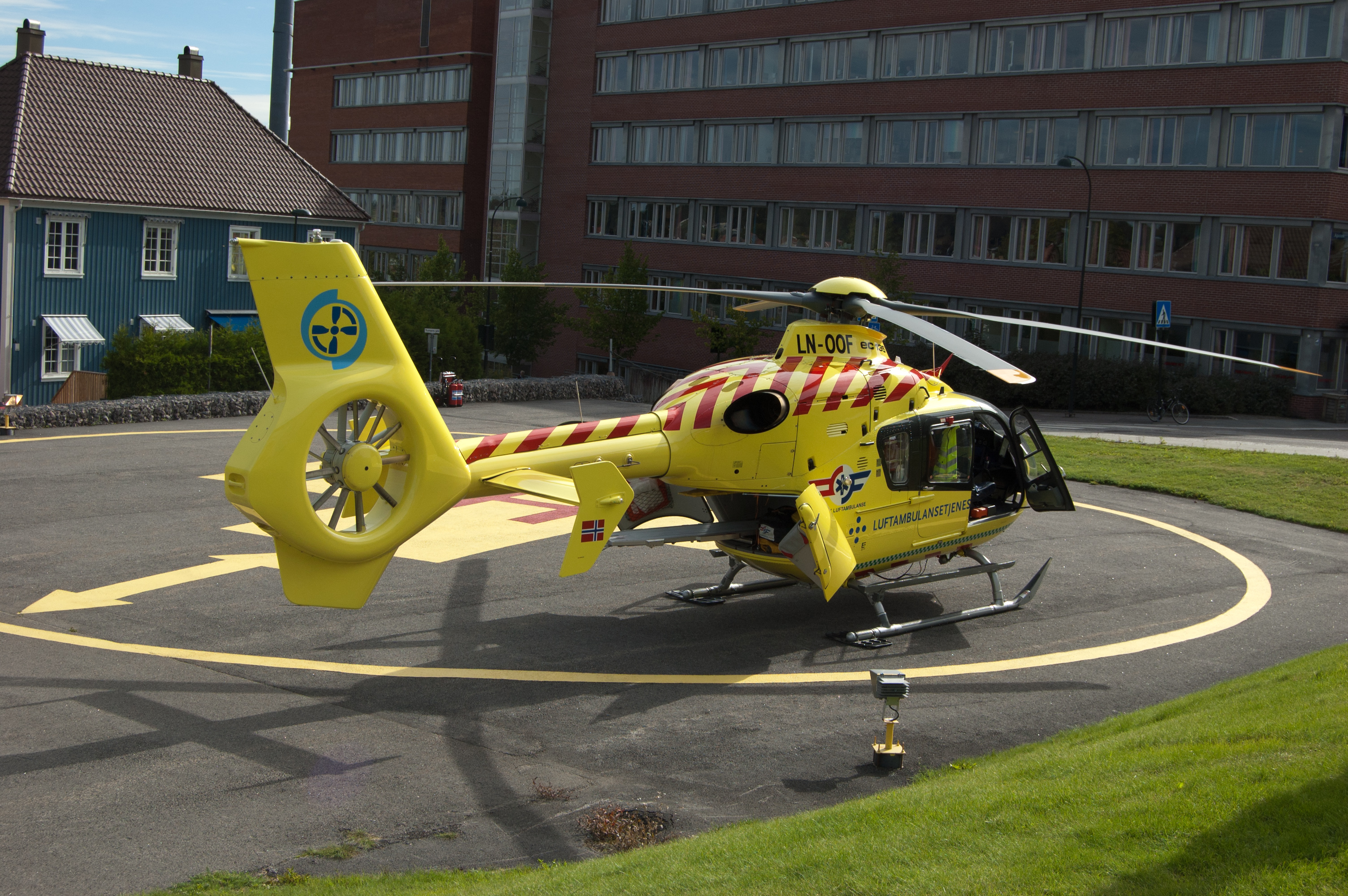
Norsk Luftambulanse Eurocopter EC135 at Tønsberg Hospital helipad

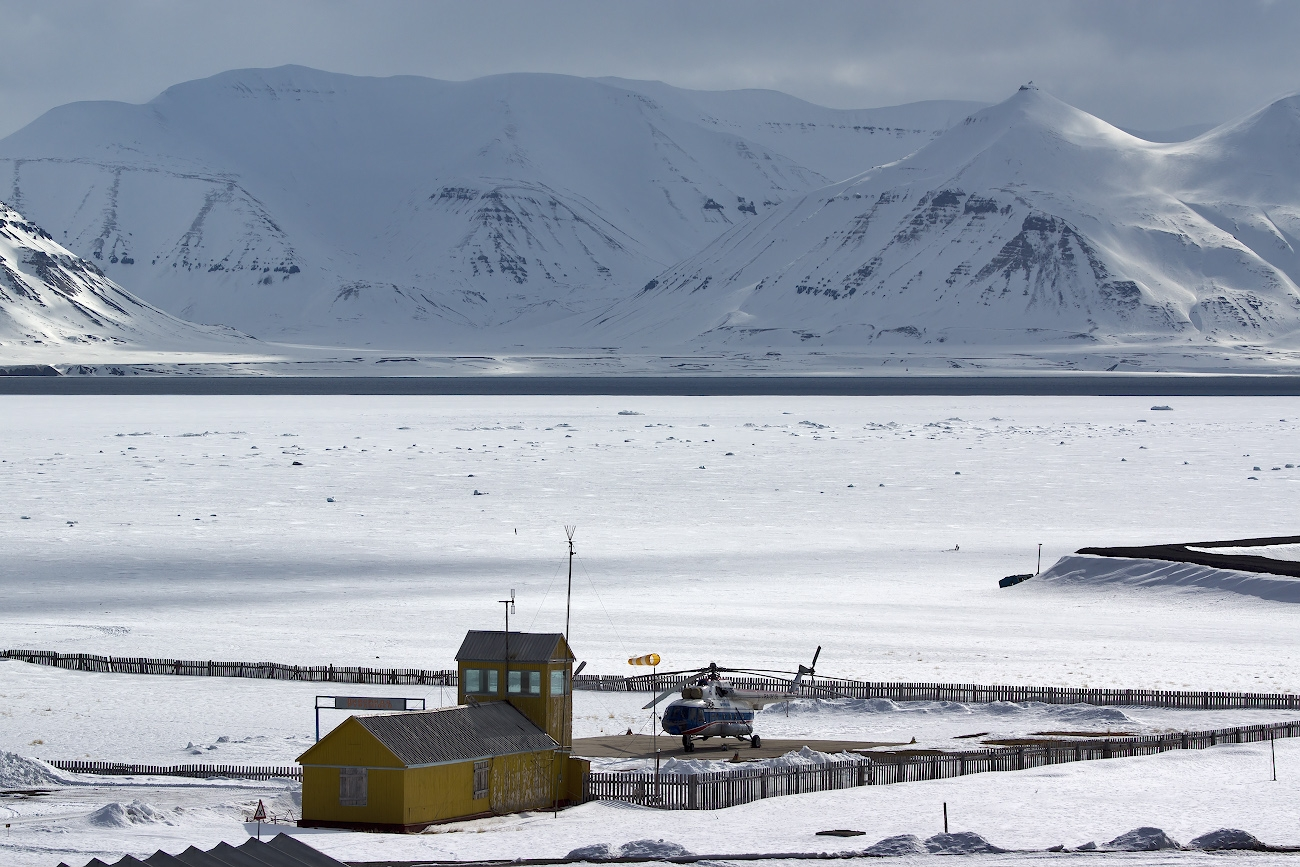
Spark+-operated Mil Mi-8 at Pyramiden Heliport on Svalbard

The most extensive part of the Norwegian helicopter transport are offshore commuting to oil platforms situated in the North Sea and the Norwegian Sea. These operate out of conventional airports, serving helidecks on board the offshore installations. The only scheduled passenger services to a heliport operate between Bodø Airport and Værøy Heliport. Former heliports on Værøya and Røst provided such services between 1970 and 1986.

The Norwegian Air Ambulance operates twelve medical helicopters out of eleven bases, with two based at Lørenskog Heliport, Ahus. All except three bases are situated on hospital grounds. Thirty hospitals have a helicopter landing site within 100 meters (330 ft) of its emergency department, of which twenty-four have CAA approval. Sixteen hospitals lack a helipad.

== Heliports ==
The list includes heliports approved by the CAA and those with an International Civil Aviation Organization airport code (ICAO code). It includes closed facilities with their former ICAO codes, but excludes any heliports located at conventional airports.

The list notes the heliports name; municipality or, in the case of Svalbard, the settlement; the county, sea or Svalbard; the type of heliport (general purpose, medical and offshore); and the owner of the facility.

Heliports in Norway
Heliport	ICAO	Location	County/Sea	Type	Owner
Aasta Hansteen	ENUN	—	Norwegian Sea	Offshore	Equinor
Ål Heliport, Medical Center	ENAH	Ål	Buskerud	Medical	Vestre Viken Hospital Trust
Ålesund Heliport, Hospital	ENAX	Ålesund	Møre og Romsdal	Medical	Møre og Romsdal Hospital Trust
Albuskjell A †	was ENXS	—	Norwegian Sea	Offshore	ConocoPhillips
Albuskjell F †	was ENXF	—	Norwegian Sea	Offshore	ConocoPhillips
Arendal Heliport, Hospital	ENAR	Arendal	Agder	Medical	Sørlandet Hospital Trust
Åsgard A	ENUA	—	Norwegian Sea	Offshore	Statoil
Åsgard B	ENUB	—	Norwegian Sea	Offshore	Statoil
Åsgard C	ENUC	—	Norwegian Sea	Offshore	Statoil
Balder	ENBE	—	North Sea	Offshore	ExxonMobil
Barentsburg Heliport, Heerodden	ENBA	Barentsburg	Svalbard	General	Arktikugol
Bergen Heliport, Grønneviksøren	ENBG	Bergen	Vestland	Medical	Bergen Hospital Trust
Bergen Heliport, Haukeland Hospital	ENBX	Bergen	Vestland	Medical	Bergen Hospital Trust
Bergen Heliport, Nygårdstangen †	was ENBG	Bergen	Vestland	Medical	Hordaland County Municipality
Bjørnøya Heliport	ENBJ	Bjørnøya Radio	Svalbard	General	Norwegian Meteorological Institute
Brage A	ENQD	—	North Sea	Offshore	Wintershall
Bykle Heliport, Hovden	—	Bykle	Agder	General	Fjellfly
Cod †	was ENXC	—	North Sea	Offshore	ConocoPhillips
Drammen Heliport, Hospital	ENDH	Drammen	Buskerud	Medical	Vestre Viken Hospital Trust
Dombås Heliport, Brunshaugen	ENDB	Dombås	Innlandet	Medical	Norsk Luftambulanse
Draupner	ENDP	—	North Sea	Offshore	Statoil
Draugen	ENDR	—	Norwegian Sea	Offshore	Shell
Edda †	was ENXE	—	North Sea	Offshore	Phillips Petroleum
Ekofisk A	ENXA	—	North Sea	Offshore	ConocoPhillips
Ekofisk H	ENEK	—	North Sea	Offshore	ConocoPhillips
Ekofisk K	ENXK	—	North Sea	Offshore	ConocoPhillips
Ekofisk L	ENLE	—	North Sea	Offshore	ConocoPhillips
Eldfisk A	ENXL	—	North Sea	Offshore	ConocoPhillips
Eldfisk B	ENXB	—	North Sea	Offshore	ConocoPhillips
Eldfisk S	ENWS	—	North Sea	Offshore	ConocoPhillips
Embla	ENXM	—	North Sea	Offshore	ConocoPhillips
Elverum Heliport, Innlandet Hospital	ENEL	Elverum	Innlandet	Medical	Innlandet Hospital Trust
Fedje Heliport, Høgden	ENFJ	Fedje	Vestland	General	Fedje Municipality
Førde Heliport, Central Hospital	ENFD	Førde	Vestland	Medical	Førde Hospital Trust
Frigg †	was ENFR	—	North Sea	Offshore	TotalEnergies
Frigg CDP1 †	was ENWQ	—	North Sea	Offshore	TotalEnergies
Frigg DP2 †	was ENXQ	—	North Sea	Offshore	TotalEnergies
Frøy †	was ENXY	—	North Sea	Offshore	TotalEnergies
Grane	ENXW	—	North Sea	Offshore	Statoil
Gudrun	ENWG	—	North Sea	Offshore	Statoil
Gullfaks A	ENGA	—	North Sea	Offshore	Statoil
Gullfaks A SPM1 †	was ENQH	—	North Sea	Offshore	Statoil
Gullfaks A SPM2 †	was ENQI	—	North Sea	Offshore	Statoil
Gullfaks B	ENQG	—	North Sea	Offshore	Statoil
Gullfaks C	ENGC	—	North Sea	Offshore	Statoil
Gyda †	was ENXG	—	North Sea	Offshore	Talisman Energy
Harstad Airport, Stangnes South	ENHR	Harstad	Troms	General	Heli-Team
Harstad Heliport, Hospital	ENHH	Harstad	Troms	Medical	University Hospital of North Norway
Haugesund Heliport, Haugesund Hospital	ENHX	Haugesund	Rogaland	Medical	Fonna Hospital Trust
Heidrun	ENHE	—	Norwegian Sea	Offshore	Statoil
Heimdal	ENHM	—	North Sea	Offshore	Statoil
Hod A	was EN??	—	Norwegian Sea	Offshore	BP
Hod B	ENXH	—	Norwegian Sea	Offshore	BP
Hønefoss Heliport, Ringerike Hospital	ENRX	Hønefoss	Buskerud	Medical	Vestre Viken Hospital Trust
Hopen Heliport	ENHO	Hopen Radio	Svalbard	General	Norwegian Meteorological Institute
Huldra †	was ENQU	—	North Sea	Offshore	Statoil
Isfjord Heliport	ENIS	Isfjord Radio	Svalbard	General	Telenor
Jotun A †	was ENXN	—	North Sea	Offshore	ExxonMobil
Jotun B †	was ENXU	—	North Sea	Offshore	ExxonMobil
Kinsarvik Heliport, Vetlemoen	—	Kinsarvik	Vestland	General	Ullensvang Municipality
Kristiansand Heliport, Hospital	ENKH	Kristiansand	Agder	Medical	Sørlandet Hospital Trust
Kristiansund Heliport, Hospital	ENKS	Kristiansund	Møre og Romsdal	Medical	Møre og Romsdal Hospital Trust
Kristin	ENUK	—	Norwegian Sea	Offshore	Statoil
Kvitebjørn	ENQK	—	North Sea	Offshore	Statoil
Lillehammer Heliport, Innlandet Hospital	ENLH	Lillehammer	Innlandet	Medical	Innlandet Hospital Trust
Lørenskog Heliport, Ahus	ENLX	Lørenskog	Akershus	Medical	Oslo University Hospital
Molde Heliport, Hospital	ENMP	Molde	Møre og Romsdal	Medical	Møre og Romsdal Hospital Trust
Narvik Heliport, Djupvik	ENND	Narvik	Nordland	General	Helitrans
Namsos Heliport, Hospital	ENNH	Namsos	Trøndelag	Medical	Nord-Trøndelag Hospital Trust
Njord A	ENNJ	—	Norwegian Sea	Offshore	Statoil
Njord B	ENNI	Haugesund	Rogaland	Ashore	Statoil
Norne A	ENNE	—	Norwegian Sea	Offshore	Statoil
Oseberg A	ENOA	—	North Sea	Offshore	Statoil
Oseberg C	ENOC	—	North Sea	Offshore	Statoil
Oseberg East	ENQE	—	North Sea	Offshore	Statoil
Oseberg South	ENQO	—	North Sea	Offshore	Statoil
Oslo Heliport, Rikshospitalet	ENRH	Oslo	Oslo	Medical	Oslo University Hospital
Oslo Heliport, Ullevål	ENUH	Oslo	Oslo	Medical	Oslo University Hospital
Petrojarl Knarr †	was ENQP	—	North Sea	Offshore	BG Group
Petrojarl Varg †	was ENXP	—	North Sea	Offshore	Talisman Energy
Pyramiden Heliport	ENPY	Pyramiden	Svalbard	General	Arktikugol
Ringhorne	ENXO	—	North Sea	Offshore	ExxonMobil
Sandnessjøen Heliport, Hospital	ENSJ	Sandnessjøen	Nordland	Medical	Helgeland Hospital Trust
Skarv	ENUS	—	North Sea	Offshore	BP
Skien Heliport, Hospital	ENTE	Skien	Telemark	Medical	Telemark Hospital Trust
Sleipner A	ENSL	—	North Sea	Offshore	Statoil
Sleipner B	ENXZ	—	North Sea	Offshore	Statoil
Snorre A	ENSE	—	North Sea	Offshore	Statoil
Snorre B	ENQR	—	North Sea	Offshore	Statoil
Statfjord A	ENSF	—	North Sea	Offshore	Statoil
Statfjord B	ENFB	—	North Sea	Offshore	Statoil
Statfjord C	ENQS	—	North Sea	Offshore	Statoil
Stavanger Heliport, Forus †	was ENFO	Solakrossen	Rogaland	General	Helikopter Service
Stavanger Heliport, University Hospital	ENSX	Stavanger	Rogaland	Medical	Norsk Luftambulanse
Suldal Heliport, Sand	ENSC	Sand	Rogaland	General	Fonnafly
Stryn Heliport, Langeset	ENLG	Stryn	Vestland	General	Helikopter Utleie
Tambar	ENXR	—	North Sea	Offshore	BP
Tønsberg Heliport, Hospital	ENTH	Tønsberg	Vestfold	Medical	Vestfold Hospital Trust
Troll A	ENQA	—	North Sea	Offshore	Statoil
Troll B	ENQB	—	North Sea	Offshore	Statoil
Troll C	ENQC	—	North Sea	Offshore	Statoil
Tromsø Heliport, University Hospital	ENTU	Tromsø	Troms	Medical	University Hospital of North Norway
Trondheim Heliport, Rosten	ENRT	Trondheim	Trøndelag	Medical	Norsk Luftambulanse
Røst Heliport †	was ENRS	Røstlandet	Nordland	General	Røst Municipality
Trondheim Heliport, St Olav's Hospital	ENTR	Trondheim	Trøndelag	Medical	St. Olav's Hospital Trust
Ula	ENLA	—	North Sea	Offshore	BP
Værøy Heloport, Tobbisodden	ENVR	Værøya	Nordland	General	Avinor
Værøy Heliport, Hanna Bakken-jordet †	—	Værøya	Nordland	General	Værøy Municipality
Valemon	ENQW	—	North Sea	Offshore	Statoil
Valhall A †	was ENVH	—	North Sea	Offshore	BP
Valhall Flank North	ENXI	—	North Sea	Offshore	BP
Valhall Flank South	ENXJ	—	North Sea	Offshore	BP
Valhall PH	ENWV	—	North Sea	Offshore	BP
Varg †	was ENXV	—	North Sea	Offshore	Talisman Energy
Veslefrikk A	ENQF	—	North Sea	Offshore	Statoil
Veslefrikk B †	was ENVF	—	North Sea	Offshore	Statoil
Visund A	ENQV	—	North Sea	Offshore	Statoil
Verdal Heliport, Slottelid	ENVS	Verdalsøra	Trøndelag	General	Midtnorsk Helikopterservice

† Heliports suffixed † have been closed.
