= Ål Heliport, Medical Center =

- IATA: none; ICAO: ENDB

Summary
- Airport type: Private
- Owner: Vestre Viken Hospital Trust
- Operator: Norsk Luftambulanse
- Serves: Ål Municipality, Norway
- Location: Hallingdal Medical Center, Ål
- Coordinates: 60.630°N 8.566°E

Map
- Location within Norway

Helipads
| Number | Length | | Surface |
| Number | m | ft | Surface |
|---|---|---|---|
| | | | Asphalt |

Ål Heliport, Medical Center (ICAO: ENDB; Norwegian: Ål helikopterplass, Sjukestugu) is a heliport situated in the village of Ål in Ål Municipality in Buskerud county, Norway. Used exclusively for air ambulance missions, it serves as a base for a Eurocopter EC-135P2+ operated by Norsk Luftambulanse on contract with the National Air Ambulance Service of Norway. The facility is owned by Vestre Viken Hospital Trust and is situated next to Hallingdal Medical Center.

== History ==
During the 1980s NLA set up an annual Easter base in a winter resort in the mountains of Southern Norway. The first was in Beitostølen in 1982. The following years this base was situated at Rjukan; Dombås; Fagernes Airport, Leirin; and Geilo Airport, Dagali, respectively. This proved popular with decision-makes, and a 1986 government commission recommended that a permanent base be established at Dombås. It opened along with five other bases in 1988, establishing the state-funded helicopter ambulance service.

The Easter bases spurred interest amongst locals in the interior valleys of Buskerud, Oppdal, and Telemark to receive a permanent helicopter ambulance service. Locals in Hallingdal were not content with being left without a helicopter ambulance. They argued that as it was, only during the week city-dwellers spent in town did the area have the same coverage as other parts of the country. Gradually two more bases were opened, in Arendal and Førde. Locally there was political support from three county councils and local activism.

The Ministry of Social Affairs concluded in 1993 that Ål was feasible. However, the annual 8 to 10 million Norwegian krone in funding would have to be allocated from other sources. Political work started in 1992, but the Ministry of Social Affairs did not prioritize it in its 1994 budget. However, this resulted in a series of political initiatives from the area and when Parliament voted over the budget, grants had been allocated.

Operations commenced on 1 September 1994, as the eleventh helicopter ambulance base in the country. The base took over missions previously designated to Dombås Heliport, Brunshaugen and Lørenskog Heliport, Central Hospital. The base was staffed with three pilots, three rescue swimmers, a secretary, a technician, an instructor and ten part-time physicians. Ownership of the base was issued to Buskerud Central Hospital. The 2001 operating tender was won by Airlift. NLA won back the operating contract in 2006.

== Facilities ==
Ål Heliport is situated in downtown Ål, next to Hallingdal Medical Center. The facility is owned and operated by Vestre Viken Hospital Trust, part of Southern and Eastern Norway Regional Health Authority. It features a hangar and a single asphalt helipad.

== Operations ==
The ambulance helicopter is operated by Norsk Luftambulanse on contract with the National Air Ambulance Service. They have a Eurocopter EC-135P2+ stationed at the heliport. The helicopter has room for a crew of three, consisting of a pilot, rescue swimming and an anesthesiologist, as well as two stretchers. Medical staff are provided by Vestre Viken Hospital Trust. The helicopter flew 594 missions lasting 689 hours in 2013.

== Bibliography ==
- Andersen, Rune (2007). Når det haster (in Norwegian). Oslo: Orion Forlag. ISBN 978-82-458-0838-4.
