= Førde Heliport, Central Hospital =

- IATA: none; ICAO: ENFD

Summary
- Airport type: Private
- Owner: Førde Hospital Trust
- Operator: Norsk Luftambulanse
- Serves: Førde, Norway
- Location: Førde Central Hospital, Vie, Sunnfjord Municipality
- Coordinates: 61.4559°N 5.8907°E

Map
- Location within Norway ENFD (Norway)

Helipads
Number	Length		Surface
Number	m	ft	Surface
	10	33	Asphalt

Førde Heliport, University Hospital (ICAO: ENFD; Norwegian: Førde helikopterplass, Sentralsykehuset) is a heliport situated on the premises of Førde Central Hospital in the Vie neighborhood in the town of Førde which is located within Sunnfjord Municipality in Vestland county, Norway. Used exclusively for air ambulance services, it is home to a Eurocopter EC-135P2+ operated by Norsk Luftambulanse (NLA) on contract with the National Air Ambulance Service. The base is owned by Førde Hospital Trust.

When the base opened in 1992, the hospital had only a helipad, while the helicopter was based at Førde Airport, Bringeland. The operations were provided by Airlift until 2001, when NLA took over. A base at the hospital opened in 2002. However, it was located such that a final run with an ambulance was needed to bring the patient to the hospital. The current base opened in 2014 and also houses the ambulance service and the medical dispatch center.

== History ==
A government commission looked into the air ambulance organization in 1982. This resulted in the National Air Ambulance Service being established in 1988, under the auspice of the National Insurance Service. Through this arrangement, Vestland was covered by helicopter ambulances based at Bergen Heliport, Nygårdstangen and Ålesund Heliport, Central Hospital. However, there were local protests several places, stating that certain areas of the country had insufficient coverage. Sogn og Fjordane was one such place. Three bases, including Førde, were established between 1991 and 1994.

Airlift was selected as the original operator of helicopters out of Førde, winning a tender with four contesters. In addition to offering the lowest price and high quality, they already operated a helicopter base at Førde Airport, Bringeland. The helicopter was based at the airport. Upon scrambling, it would take off and then land at the helipad at the Central Hospital. There the rescue swimming and anesthesiologist boarded the helicopter.

A special rule for the Førde base was that a mechanic accompanied the helicopter on missions. In 1998 this role was replaced by another pilot. Norsk Luftambulanse won the tender to operate Førde from December 2001. However, they were required to drop the extra pilot from 1 January 2004.

The split base increased response times, sometimes by up to ten minutes. Therefore, a base was constructed on the facilities of the Førde Central Hospital. The new base opened on 4 November 2002. It had a helipad of 20.5 meters (67 ft) diameter, and was able to handle the larger Westland Sea King helicopters. However, it was 150 meters (490 ft) from the emergency department, so that patients had to be taken there by ambulance.

The former location consisted of sheds and a plastic hangar, unsatisfactory conditions, so work commenced in the late 2000s to build a new base at the hospital. This was designed to include the medical dispatch center, and host the ambulance service and itshelicopter. The plans were passed by the board of Førde Hospital Trust in May 2012.

A major hindrance came in January 2012 when the Directorate for Cultural Heritage listed the Central Block as a representative work for Norwegian hospital architecture of the 1970s. This hindered the establishment of a skywalk between the planned base and the central block to provide quick access for acute patients. The directorate stated that the plans would only be permitted if the skywalk was cut off a few meters from the facade, forcing the patients outdoors for the distance. There were also raised issue from the municipality regarding noise pollution.

The plans stipulated the base to cost 119 million kr. Architects were Solem Arkitektur and the contractor was Åsen & Øvrelid. Construction began in December 2012. The cost of construction ended at 166 million kr. The facility was officially opened on 26 September 2014, although it had been taken into use on 5 September.

== Facilities ==
The heliport is located centrally within the facilities of Førde Central Hospital, located in the Vie neighborhood of Førde. The base is situated in its own building, a combined hangar, helipad, parking garage and office complex measuring 3,333 square meters (35,880 sq ft). In addition to housing the helicopter service, it acts as a base for the medical dispatch center and the ambulances. The facility is connected to the hospital's emergency department via a skywalk. The helipad is sufficiently large to support two simultaneous aircraft. The facility is owned by Førde Hospital Trust, part of Western Norway Regional Health Authority.

== Operations ==
The ambulance helicopters are operated by Norsk Luftambulanse on contract with the National Air Ambulance Service. They have a Eurocopter EC-135P2+ stationed at the heliport. It has room for a crew of three, consisting of a pilot, rescue swimming and an anesthesiologist, as well as two stretchers. Medical staff are provided by Førde Central Hospital. The helicopter flew 610 missions lasting 664 hours in 2013. The 300 Squadron had an average 13 annual landings in the period from 2005 to 2011.

== Bibliography ==
- Andersen, Rune (2007). Når det haster (in Norwegian). Oslo: Orion Forlag. ISBN 978-82-458-0838-4.
- Ministry of Health, Social Affairs (1998). Luftambulansetjenesten i Norge (PDF) (in Norwegian). Vol. 8.
