= Trondheim Airport (disambiguation) =

Trondheim Airport, Værnes, is the international airport serving the city of Trondheim, Norway.

Former airports serving the city include:

- Trondheim Airport, Hommelvik, a former water aerodrome
- Trondheim Airport, Ilsvika, a former water aerodrome
- Trondheim Airport, Jonsvatnet, a former water aerodrome
- Trondheim Airport, Lade, a former airport
- Trondheim Airport, Øysand, a former air base
- Trondheim Airport, Skogn, a former airport

== See also ==
- Trondheim Heliport, Rosten, a medical heliport
- Trondheim Heliport, St. Olav's University Hospital, a medical helipad situated at St. Olav's University Hospital
