= Mørefly =

Norwegian airline, 1955–1995

- Founded: 1955
- Ceased operations: 1995
- Operating bases: Ålesund Airport, Sørneset (1955–79); Ålesund Airport, Vigra (1979–95)
- Parent company: Helikopter Service (1992–95)
- Headquarters: Giske Municipality, Norway

Mørefly A/S was an airline and general aviation company which operated between 1955 and 1995. Based in Ålesund Municipality and later Giske Municipality, Norway, it was involved in a wide range of operations, the most dominant being air ambulance services and helicopter services. Mørefly was based at Ålesund Airport, Sørneset until 1979 and thereafter at Ålesund Airport, Vigra. During its peak in the mid-1990s it had 150 employees and annual revenue of 250 million Norwegian krone (NOK).

The airline was established in 1955 and based at the water aerodrome at Sørneset. Its fleet consisted entirely of seaplanes until 1966, when the first helicopter, a Bell 47G4, was delivered. The airline expanded through two joint ventures into Bergen Airport, Flesland from 1974. Heavy cargo operations became important in the 1980s, when the airline participated in two major hydroelectric power station projects. The only scheduled flights were between Ålesund and Aberdeen for a year starting in 1986.

Mørefly became a major contractor of the National Air Ambulance Service when it was established in 1988. From 1994 it flew fixed-winged ambulances out of six airports. From 1991 it started offshore flights to oil platforms out of Bergen. Helikopter Service bought Mørefly in 1992 and merged it with its other subsidiary, Lufttransport, three years later.

== History ==
=== Establishment ===
Mørefly was established by Elling Lande, Per Dalen and Kåre Stein Haram on 10 June 1955. One year earlier they and other enthusiasts had bought a Luscombe 8 Silvaire seaplane. The company was initially based at Ålesund Airport, Sørneset. It took various general aviation contracted work, such as cargo transport, aerial photography and searching for herring steams. At first the company used the Silvaire, but sold it a year later.

The commercial break-through took place in 1957, when an agreement was reached with the Ministry of Social Affairs to carry out air ambulance services in the area between Sunnfjord and Nordmøre. For this they bought a Republic RC-3 Seabee. The company expanded rapidly, and by 1961 it was operating three Seabees, a Grumman G-44 Widgeon and the Fairchild PT-19 Cornell. From 1964 the company hired a scuba diver and placed him on standby. The service was provided to fishing vessels who could call in cases where they got a line in the propeller or other technical issues.

The airline bought two Piper PA-22 Tri-Pacers in 1962 and a Cessna 185 two years later. The Seabees and the Cornells were retired in 1965, followed by the Tri-Pacers a year after. They were replaced with a Maule M-4, but also this was retired after two years. Instead Mørefly shifted focus to the helicopter market. The first helicopter, a Bell 47G4, was bought in 1966. It was supplemented with a -J2 variant on pontoons the following year. An Agusta Bell 206 A Jet Ranger was procured in 1968 and was intended for search and rescue and cargo flights.

From 1969 the airline's only fixed-wing aircraft was a Cessna 206. Mørefly continued to purchase helicopters, including an Agusta Bell 204B in 1972. A Piper PA-31 Navajo was bought in 1976 and kept for ten years.

During the mid-1970s Mørefly established two joint ventures at Bergen Airport, Flesland. Off Shore Helikopter was founded in 1975 in cooperation with Heli-tourist and Fred. Olsen & Co. It flew workers to offshore oil platforms using two Aérospatiale SA330 Puma. The second was a cooperation with Norving to operate two Piper Navajo. Named Mørefly–Norving AS, it was established on the remains of the bankrupt Fjordfly, which was established in 1957 and had flow out of Flesland since 1971. The main market was charter traffic from the growing petroleum industry, largely across the North Sea to the United Kingdom. From 1980 to 1986 the company also operated the Cessna 404 Titan. The Navajos were sold in 1988.

Norsk Luftambulanse (NLA) started the first helicopter ambulance service in Norway on 7 June 1978. As they initially lacked an air operator's certificate, their operation with a Messerschmitt-Bölkow-Blohm Bo 105 from Lørenskog Heliport, Central Hospital was subcontracted to Mørefly. Citing high operating costs, NLA switched to Partnair from 1 May 1979.

=== Move to Vigra ===
Mørefly decided in 1977 to move its Ålesund base from Sørneset to Ålesund Airport, Vigra. They built a new 750-square-meter (8,100 sq ft) combined hangar and office building at the airport and moved in 1979. The same year the airline bought two Aérospatiale AS350B Écureuil and the following year a Bell 214B. The latter was used for a major contract in the construction of the Aurland Power Station. In extension Mørefly won the contract with the construction of the Jostedal Power Station. This led to the temporary establishment of a heliport at Gaupne, which was in use between 1983 and 1989.

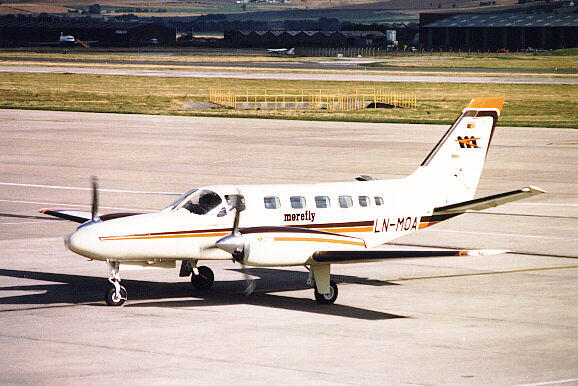
Mørefly Cessna 441 Conquest II at Aberdeen Airport in 1986

The airline bought a Cessna 441 Conquest II in 1981. The ten-passenger aircraft was mostly used for business charter services. It was later supplemented with a Beechcraft Super King Air 200. The company also joined the joint venture Commuter Service in 1985, along with the other Norwegian regional airlines Coast Aero Center, Norsk Air and Trønderfly. The intention was to create a cooperative company which could compete in a more diversified market. They stated that the organizational structure among regional airlines was 15 years out of date and that the group would take market shares in a growing market, especially by starting new niche direct services.

This led Mørefly to investigate the possibilities to start scheduled services. The airline applied to the Ministry of Transport and Communications for a concession to operate from Ålesund to Aberdeen Airport in the United Kingdom. The first application was rejected, but the second was approved. The route commenced on 14 April 1986. This was the first international route a Norwegian airline was allowed to fly against the recommendation of Scandinavian Airlines System, who held a judicial monopoly on such routes. Mørefly flew the route three times per week, but only had two or three passengers per trip. This led to a major loss on the operation. Instead Mørefly applied to fly a domestic coastal route from Ålesund via Molde Airport, Årø; Kristiansund Airport, Kvernberget; and Ørland Airport to Trondheim Airport, Værnes in the hopes that these could feed the Ålesund route, but no such permission was granted. The route was therefore terminated on 28 March 1987.

=== Offshore ===
The airline's hangar and office structure was extended to 1,600 square meters (17,000 sq ft) in 1987. The following year a base was established at Mo i Rana Airport, Røssvoll. The National Air Ambulance Service was established on 1 January 1988. Mørefly bid and won the contracts for a fixed-wing King Air 200 and an Aérospatiale SA365N Dauphin 2 helicopter based av Vigra. It succeeded as renewing its contract, which lasted until 31 December 1998.

After losing two Westland Sea King search and rescue (SAR) helicopters in 1988 and initiating an upgrade program for the fleet, the 330 Squadron was not able to maintain its operational levels. The Ministry of Justice therefore signed an agreement with Mørefly to maintain a SAR helicopter at Vigra as a temporary solution. Mørefly therefore acquired an Aérospatiale SA332 Super Puma for this job. These were based at Vigra from 1 November 1988 to 31 January 1989 and subsequently at Sandefjord Airport, Torp from 1 February 1989 to 31 December 1990.

Mørefly entered the offshore helicopter market in 1989, when it received a concession to operate such flights. These had previously exclusively been operated by Helikopter Service. Mørefly signed a 350 million Norwegian krone deal with Statoil in 1990 for a five-year contract flying out of Flesland. Mørefly established a base there and used Super Pumas on the service. The number of employees hit 90 and the company had a revenue of NOK 130 million per year. As a reaction to entering the offshore market, Helikopter Service bought 44 percent of Mørefly in January 1991, with an option to purchase the remainder. The effectuated this right in 1992

In April 1993 the tender for the air ambulance services were announced, and from 1 January 1994 Mørefly had a much more extensive network. In addition to Vigra, fixed-wing bases were taken over at Brønnøysund Airport, Brønnøy; Bodø Airport; Tromsø Airport; Alta Airport; and Kirkenes Airport, Høybuktmoen. The number of Beechcraft King Air thereby increased to six. The base at Ålesund Heliport, Central Hospital opened in May 1993, allowing the Dauphin 2 to be moved there. With these contracts the company's revenue increased to NOK 250 million and 150 employees.

The company's final major contract was signed in 1995, when the Norwegian Coast Guard signed an agreement for maritime surveillance over the North Sea. Later that year Mørefly and Lufttransport—also a Helikopter Service subsidiary—were merged. The new company took Lufttransport's name and was situated in its head offices in Tromsø, although it retained Mørefly's air operator's certificate and organization number.

== Fleet ==
The following is a list of aircraft operated by Mørefly.

Mørefly aircraft
Model	Qty	Built	First in	Last out	Ref(s)
Luscombe 8 Silvaire	1	1947	1955	1956	
Republic RC-3 Seabee	3	1946–47	1957	1965	
Fairchild PT-19-FA Cornell	1	1941	1960	1965	
Grumman G-44 Widgeon	1	1943	1960	1970	
Piper PA-22 Tri-Pacer	2	1958–60	1962	1966	
Cessna 185D	1	1964	1964	1969	
Maule M-4-210 Rocket	1	1966	1966	1968	
Bell 47G-4	2	1960–64	1966	1975	
Augusta Bell 206	2	1968	1968	1981	
Cessna U.206C	1	1968	1969	1980	
Bell 204B	1	1971	1972	1989	
Piper PA-31 Navajo	1	1974	1976	1986	
Messerschmitt-Bölkow-Blohm Bo 105	1	1974	1978	1978	
Bell 214B-1	1	1979	1980	1992	
Cessna 441 Conquest II	1	1980–81	1981	1990	
Aérospatiale SA 315B Lama	1	1983	1983	1985	
Bell 205A-1	4	1976–79	1985	1993	
Aérospatiale SA350B-1 Écureuil	7	1978–89	1979	1995	
Beechcraft Super King Air 200	13	1977–93	1986	1995	
Aérospatiale SA365N Dauphin 2	1	1984	1987	1995	
Aérospatiale SA332 Super Puma	3	1984–91	1989	1995	

== Bibliography ==
- Andersen, Rune (2007). Når det haster (in Norwegian). Oslo: Orion Forlag. ISBN 978-82-458-0838-4.
- Hagby, Kay (1998). Fra Nielsen & Winther til Boeing 747 (in Norwegian). Drammen: Hagby. ISBN 8299475201.
- Hjelle, Bjørn Owe (2007). Ålesund lufthavn Vigra (in Norwegian). Valderøya. ISBN 978-82-92055-28-1.
- Melling, Kjersti (2009). Nordavind fra alle kanter (in Norwegian). Oslo: Pilotforlaget.
