= Stavanger Airport (disambiguation) =

Stavanger Airport normally refers to Stavanger Airport, Sola

It may also refer to:

- Stavanger Airport, Forus, a former military air base and later heliport
- Stavanger Heliport, University Hospital, a medical heliport
