= VKM =

VKM or vkm may refer to:

== Science and technology ==
- Vehicle keeper marking, railcar registration mark
- Vehicle-kilometre, measure of traffic flow
- All-Russia Collection of Microorganisms (Vserossiyskaya kollektsiya mikroorganizmov), microbiological culture collection
- ISO 639-3 code for the Kamakan language
- Norwegian Scientific Committee for Food and Environment (Vitenskapskomiteen for mat og miljø)

== Other uses ==
- Vasant Kanya Mahavidyalaya, women's college in Varanasi, India
- Vincent Kennedy McMahon, former chairman and chief executive officer of WWE
- Voodoo Kin Mafia, wrestling tag team (a play on the initials of Vincent Kennedy McMahon)
- BundesselbsthilfeVerband Kleinwüchsiger Menschen, German dwarfism organization
