= Førde Central Hospital =

- Førde Hospital Trust

Geography
- Location: Vie, Sunnfjord Municipality, Norway
- Coordinates: 61.4559°N 5.8907°E

Organisation
- Type: General

Services
- Emergency department: Yes

Helipads
- Helipad: Førde Heliport, Central Hospital

Links
- Website: helse-forde
- Lists: Hospitals in Norway

Førde Central Hospital (Norwegian: Førde sentralsjukehus) is a general hospital situated in the Vie neighborhood of the town of Førde which is located within Sunnfjord Municipality in Vestland county, Norway. It is the main facility of Førde Hospital Trust, part of Western Norway Regional Health Authority. It has 1300 employees and serves as a central hospital for Vestland and as a local hospital for Sunnfjord outer parts of Sogn.

Proposals for a central hospital for Sogn og Fjordane arose in the late 1960s. The county council opposed the plans, instead wanting a series of small hospitals throughout the county. The decision was overruled by the Parliament in 1971. Construction started in 1976 and the Central Block opened three years later. Operations were at the time provided by Sogn og Fjordane County Municipality. By then a nursing college had also been established in Førde, today part of Sogn og Fjordane University College. The hospital was taken over by the state in 2002 and became part of Førde Hospital Trust.

Førde received an ambulance heliport service in 1992, at first based at Førde Airport, Bringeland. From 2002 it moved to the hospital premises. The current Førde Heliport, Central Hospital opened in September 2014.
