= Norsk Luftambulanse =

Norwegian air ambulance service

- Founded: 4 December 1977
- Founder: Jens Moe
- Type: Foundation
- Location: Drøbak, Frogn Municipality, Norway
- Product: Air ambulance
- Members: 706,000
- Key people: Terje Thon (Chairman); Åslaug Haga (Secretary General)
- Employees: 220
- Website: norskluftambulanse.no

Stiftelsen Norsk Luftambulanse ("Norwegian Air Ambulance Foundation", NLA) is a Norwegian humanitarian organisation, organised as a non-profit foundation. It primarily promotes and operates helicopter air ambulance services. As of 2014, they operate seven Eurocopter EC135 and one EC145 helicopters out of seven bases in Norway, based on contracts with the state through the Norwegian Air Ambulance. In Denmark, they operate four EC135 out of four bases.

The foundation carries out charitable work, including providing additional funding for all helicopter ambulances in Norway to increase their medical equipment. It also funds research within critical emergency medicine and operates a service to fly its members home in case of illness. With 706,000, it is the organization in Norway with the most members. Operations are carried out through the subsidiary Norsk Luftambulanse AS.

Established in 1977 by Jens Moe, operations out of Lørenskog Heliport, Central Hospital started the following year. The services out of Stavanger commenced in 1981. The state funding started in 1988, after which NLA established the bases at Bergen and Trondheim. NLS later won contracts to operate out of Arendal, Ål, Dombås, and Førde.

== History ==
=== Establishment ===
A government commission which published its results in 1977 considered the possibility for a helicopter-based air ambulance service. They concluded that although there could be benefits with a service, the cost would have to weighed up with other health activities. The commission also commented on that the helicopters would lay hold on a large number of physicians.

Parallel with this work the Drøbak-based Jens Moe started working with plans to establish a helicopter ambulance service. He was inspired by the systems applied in West Germany and Switzerland, run by ADAC and Rega. This model involved crewing the helicopter with an anesthesiologist, a rescue swimmer and a pilot. Since the late 1960s he had been working for an improved ambulance service, which he wanted to carry anesthesiologists or anesthesia nurses.

Norsk Luftambulanse AS was incorporated on 6 November 1977, originally with Moe, Fred Øistein Andersen and Ingvar Vilfladt as shareholders. However, they were in need of funding and decided to establish a foundation which would own the operating company and fund it through charitable donations. They decided to follow the example of the German Björn-Steiger-Stiftung and name the foundation after a patient who probably would have lived with quicker response times. They identified the nine-year-old Bård Østgaard who drowned in Groruddammen in Oslo in August 1975. The parents were sceptical, but hesitantly agreed to the naming scheme. Within a few weeks Moe had organized a 700,000 Norwegian krone loan from Storebrand. On 26 November 1977, Bård Østgaards Stiftelse was incorporated.

Initially the foundation started fund-raising to run a one-year trial with a helicopter based near Oslo. Moe and Andersen held a meeting with Minister of Social Affairs Ruth Ryste. Although she saw the advantages of the case, she could not support it. A major concern was that the service would be provided in Eastern Norway, the most densely populated part of the country. She stated if such a service was adapted, it should be provided equally throughout the country and the Western Norway or Northern Norway would be more natural areas to start, with longer distances and poor infrastructure.

Instead Moe turned to the Norwegian Automobile Federation (NAF), which in 1975 had attempted to start a similar project in Moss in cooperation with the Norwegian Armed Forces' medical services. They cooperated in 1977 and brought an ADAC helicopter to various sites in Eastern Norway. By indicated that each location was a possible candidate for a base, they were able to garnish support from the various local newspapers. However, NAF did not have funds to follow through on the project and pulled out. Instead Moe approached LHL, which supported their plans. They bought shares in the operating company and issued a guarantee, in exchange for a seat on the board.

The foundation sent out 850,000 brochures to recruit members. Costing half a million krone, it brought in 3000 members. They chartered a Rega helicopter which they toured Eastern Norway. On 11 March they were had a demonstration at Holmenkollbakken, when a group of youth were hit by an avalanche at Norefjell. The helicopter was immediately dispatched and participated in the rescue. Erik Berge was hired as managing director and his main task was to recruit members. By the end of 1978, the organization had 13,700 members.

To make membership more attractive, NLA cooperated with Rega to provide free flights home for its members under given conditions, using Rega's aircraft. An operations center was established in Drøbak. It gradually developed more as an advisory call center, focusing on giving members advise either before travel or after incidents had occurred. The base was later moved to Lørenskog and the division was named Global Medical Services (GMS).

=== Lørenskog and Stavanger ===
Norsk Luftambulanse started discussions with Akershus County Municipality, who were positive to the service. This resulted in Akershus Central Hospital (SiA, today Ahus) being selected as the initial base. NLA's first helicopter was a Messerschmitt-Bölkow-Blohm Bo 105 which was leased from the manufacturer and named Bård 1. To aid funding, it received advertisements. The service was inaugurated on 7 June 1978. Although SiA received a heliport, no helipads were built at Rikshospitalet in Oslo. Therefore, NLA often had to land at Bislett Stadion and transfer patients to an ambulance there.

NLA did not have an air operator's certificate to begin with and subcontracted operations to Mørefly. They received NOK 180,000 per month, In addition came the costs for medical personnel, the base and medical equipment. LHL retracted their support in February 1979, citing poor administration. They subsequently sold their shares in the operating company to the foundation. Also Endre Bolsø, Østgaards' stepfather and chairman of the board, criticized the lack of financial control. From 1 May 1979 they therefore switched operator to Partnair. They proposed moving the base to Oslo Airport, Fornebu to cut costs, but this was rejected.

The Ministry of Social Affairs evaluated the helicopter ambulance service after a year. They carried out 216 missions, of which the commission found that five instances where the air ambulance had been decisive to rescue the person's life and avoid permanent injury. They concluded that the helicopter was profitable for society, but did not find it to be optimal use of limited resources in the health sector. It concluded that a service would only be efficient if located on-site at a hospital with quick scrambling of anesthesiologist, where it was well-coordinated with ground ambulance services and emergency communications, and in densely populated areas.

By February 1980 Bolsø and Østegaard's mother were sufficiently fed up with the situation that they asked that the foundation remove Østgaard's name from its name. This was followed up and on 17 June 1980 the foundation took its current name. The same year NLA received its own air operator's certificate.

The section initiative to build a base took place at Rogaland Central Hospital in Stavanger. As in Akershus there were mixed reactions towards the service. Twenty-three municipalities in three counties gave financial support, as did a series of companies. Rogaland County Municipality approved the plans, but did not provide funding. The main area of dispute was whether helicopters were cost-efficient, and whether the money would not instead be better utilized in other pre-hospital tasks. The project did not receive the support of the Directorate of Health. Stavanger Heliport, Central Hospital opened on 4 June 1981.

=== State funding ===
A government commission looked into the air ambulance organization in 1982. It recommended that the county municipalities take responsibility for the services in the same way the funded and operated the conventional ambulance services. However, the counties were not necessarily a natural border, so it would require inter-county cooperation. The Ministry of Social Affairs concluded that the counties were not large enough to support such a service and therefore proposed a national organization, where the counties paid part of the cost. The national coordination was placed with the National Insurance Service.

During Easter NLA assigned special preparedness for mountainous areas. This resulted in a series of "Easter bases" equipped for the week. The first was in Beitostølen in 1982. The following years this base was situated at Rjukan; Dombås; Fagernes Airport, Leirin; and Geilo Airport, Dagali, respectively.

A new government commission investigated the issue in 1986. The background was doubling of both costs and use of fixed-wing and rotor-craft air ambulance use between 1982 and 1985. A major contributor was the lack of physicians in Finnmark. The commission recommended that eight bases be established. In addition to Lørenskog and Stavanger, new bases would be established in Tromsø, Brønnøysund, Trondheim, Ålesund, Bergen and Dombås. The plan was carried through and the new bases became operative as of 1988. Funding was secured by the state, while the county municipalities were responsible for the respective medical personnel. The aviation operations were subcontracted to commercial airlines. The new system was named the State's Air Ambulance.

Fifteen companies bid to operate the various helicopter contracts. In addition to keeping its operations in Lørenskog and Stavanger, NLA was awarded the contract for Trondheim, Bergen and Dombås. Trondheim was well covered by the 330 Squadron from Ørland Main Air Station, and therefore there been a debate if another helicopter would be cost-efficient. Initial plans called for a base at Trondheim Regional Hospital, but instead Trondheim Heliport, Rosten was placed near Tiller.

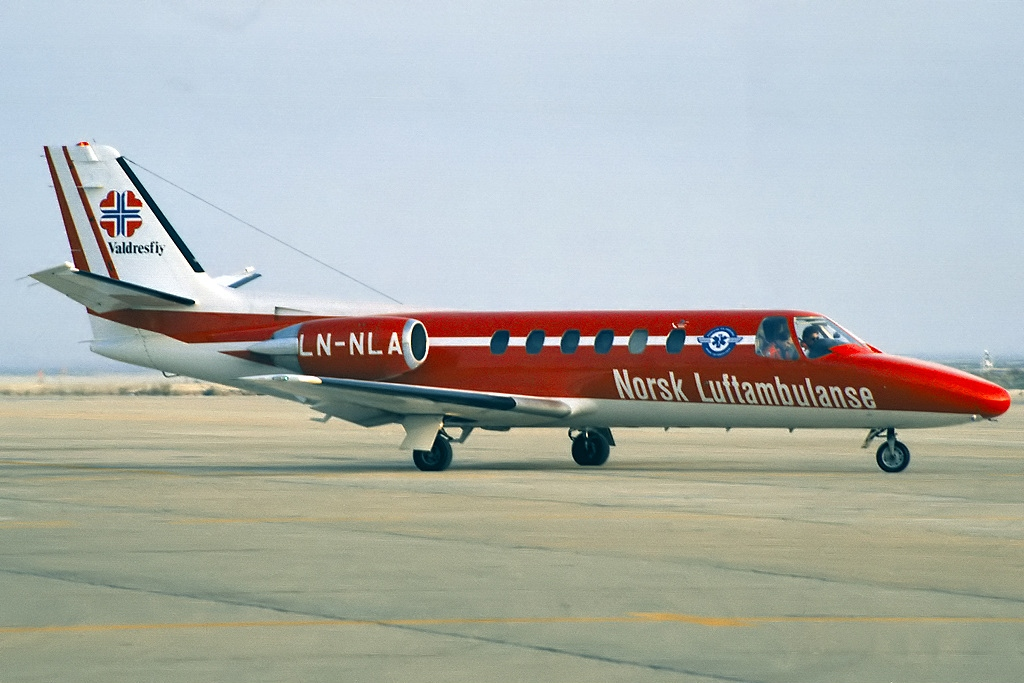
The foundation's Cessna Citation II

NLA station a helicopter in Lesja Municipality for the National Shooting Competition in 1985. The local communities in northern Gudbrandsdalen therefore started working to receive their own base. The quickly opted for Dombås, as it was the center of the district. With local funding, the state gave permission to open a base from 1 January 1988. A facility was built at the municipal medical center, with Dovre Municipality and Lesja Municipality paying for the construction. However, a more suitable base was needed and a new heliport opened on 8 March 1991.

In Bergen it was not possible to establish a helipad at the hospital. Instead Bergen Heliport, Nygårdstangen was built, close to the city center. From there patients were transported by ambulance to Haukeland Hospital. The helicopters would on occasion land on a lot at the hospital, although the physician had to claim necessity as the site lacked certification.

During the summer of 1986 NLA stationed its reserve helicopter in Arendal. This proved popular and they continued to have a temporary base their each summer. The commission stated that Agder and Telemark were well within the catchment areas of Stavanger and Lørenskog. When the national commission decided not to establish a base in Agder, several local agencies started working to establish a permanent base anyway. This also resulted in a local location struggle. Vest-Agder County Municipality argued that the base should be situated at Vest-Agder Central Hospital in Kristiansand, while Aust-Agder County Municipality wanted it at Aust-Agder Central Hospital in Arendal. Parliament approved the Arendal Heliport, Hospital, allowing it to start operations in 1991.

In Northern Norway there had since the 1930s been operated fixed-wing seaplane ambulances. These were often flowing in a combination of ambulance and charter services. In the public procurement process, NLA allied themselves with Widerøe and Air Express. The latter two would operate the aircraft, while NLA would man them with medical personnel. The consortium won the contracts for Tromsø Airport, Alta Airport and Kirkenes Airport, Høybuktmoen. NLA established a Northern Norway operations central at Widerøe's offices at Bodø Airport.

=== Acquisitions ===
Due to a strenuous cooperation with Air Express, NLA decided to establish a fixed-wing division in 1989. This included taking over the two aircraft at Kirkenes and the jet used for international flights at Oslo Airport, Fornebu. For this work NLA bought a Cessna Citation II, when they operated between 1989 and 1995.

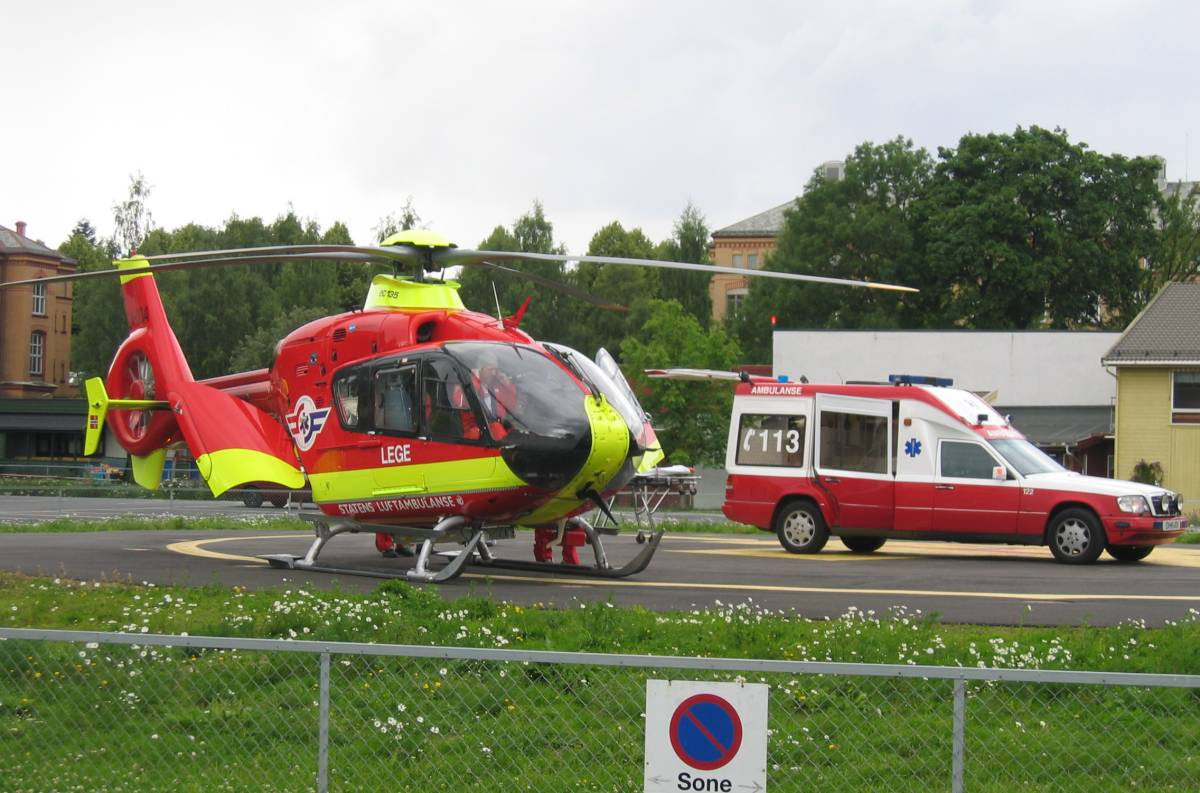
Norsk Luftambulanse operates Eurocopter EC 135 helicopters

Førde Heliport, Central Hospital was established in 1992 and the contract was issued to Airlift. In 1993 there was a new contract tender, and Airlift won the operations out of Førde, Bergen and Dombås. Within NLA there was a debate as to whether to treat Airlift as a competitor or to cooperate with them. A deal was struck and NLA bought 34 percent of the company. Later it bought a further 32 percent, but later sold the shares again. In 1994 NLA lost the contract to operate fixed-wing aircraft in Kirkenes to Mørefly.

The Easter bases spurred interest amongst locals in the interior valleys of Buskerud, Oppdal, and Telemark to receive a permanent helicopter ambulance service. Political work started in 1992, but the Ministry of Social Affairs did not prioritize it in its 1994 budget. However, this resulted in a series of political initiatives from the area and when Parliament voted over the budget, grants had been allocated for Ål Heliport. Operations commenced on 1 September 1994. The same year NLA stationed a helicopter in Lillehammer for the duration of the 1994 Winter Olympics.

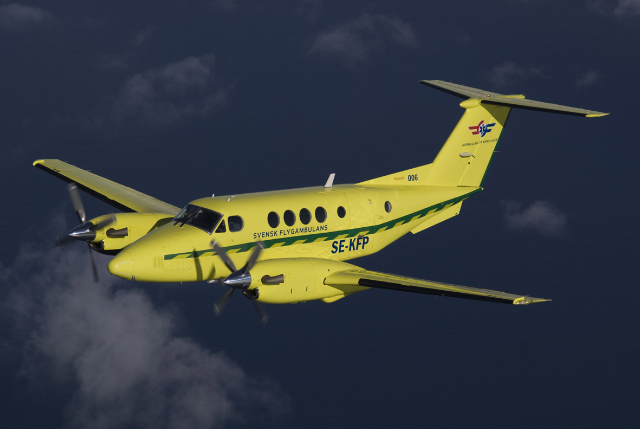
A Beechcraft Super King Air of Svensk Flygambulans

The tender for operations after 2001 resulted in NLA losing the operating rights for Arendal, Ål and Dombås, while it won back the operations in Bergen. With the hospital reform which took effect 1 January 2002, the coordinating responsibility for hospitals was allocated to the five regional health authorities. They created the National Air Ambulance Service in 2004. GMS was moved to Ullevål University Hospital in Oslo in 2002. In March 2006 NLA the results of a new tender were announced. NLA kept its existing bases and was also awarded the contract for Arendal, Ål an Dombås from 2008 to 2014 or 2018.

NLA bought the Swedish air ambulance operator SOS Flygambulans from SOS Alarm in May 2004 and renamed it Svensk Flygambulans. The subsidiary was based at Gothenburg City Airport and operated three fixed-wing aircraft. NLA saw it as a strategic move to expand its operations both geographically, as well as making them able to enter the fixed-wing market. NLA sold Svensk Flygambulans to Scandinavian Air Ambulance in August 2008.

Central Hålogaland was the most densely populated district of Norway lacking a helicopter ambulance service. The National Air Ambulance Service therefore issued a tender in 2014 to establish a base at Harstad/Narvik Airport, Evenes. The tender was won by NLA, who started operations in May 2015. The base held an EC145 helicopter.

Denmark introduced a trial with helicopter ambulances in 2011. After the trial period, they announced in October 2013 that NLA had won a six-year contract to operate the new national air ambulance service, with an option to expand the contract to nine years. If executed, the contract is worth one billion Danish krone. The contract was made with Regions Denmark, a cooperation between the five regions of Denmark.

== Operations ==
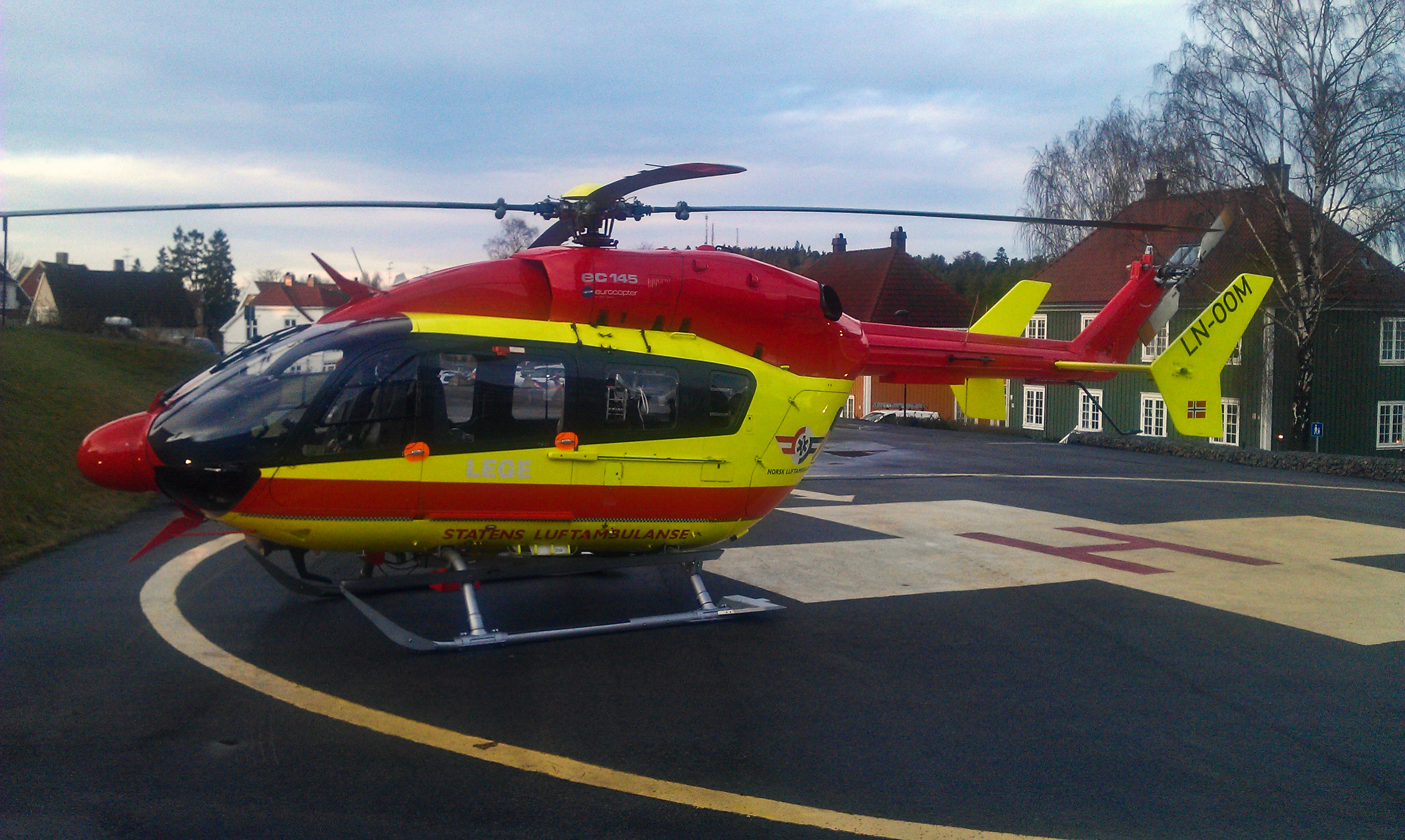
NLA's Eurocopter EC145 at Tønsberg Hospital

Stiftelsen Norsk Luftambulanse is a non-profit foundation based in Drøbak. It has 706,000 members, making it the largest organization in Norway by number of members. The foundation provides funding for all heliports, independent of operator, to be equipped with an ambulance emergency response vehicle with similar equipment to that which is installed in the helicopters. The vehicles are used when the anesthesiologists are needed at accidents near the heliport, in which road transport is faster or more convenient than the helicopter. Donations are used to support research within emergency medicine. NLA has at any time twenty people working on doctoral dissertations in the field.

Members of the foundation are entitled advise from NLA's Global Medical Services, situated at Ullevål University Hospital. The center can be used both for advice before travel and after sickness or accidents have occurred. Granted that the member has valid travel insurance, NLA may under given circumstances dispatch a nurse to aid the patient. NLA provides free first-aid courses for its members. The foundation also publishes a quarterly membership magazine, Magasin.

Norsk Luftambulanse AS is a limited company wholly owned by the foundation that operate ambulance helicopters for the National Air Ambulance Service. It operates twenty helicopters, consisting of two Eurocopter EC135 P2+, nine Eurocopter EC135 T3 and nine Eurocopter EC145 T2. These operate out of twelve bases in Norway and four in Denmark. The company had a revenue of NOK 216 million in 2009 and had 100 employees.

Bases
Heliport	ICAO	Municipality	Country	Owner
Ål Heliport, Medical Center	ENAH	Ål	Norway	Vestre Viken Hospital Trust
Arendal Heliport, Hospital	ENAR	Arendal	Norway	Sørlandet Hospital Trust
Bergen Heliport, Grønneviksøren	ENBG	Bergen	Norway	Bergen Hospital Trust
Billund Airport	EKBI	Billund	Denmark	—
Dombås Heliport, Brunshaugen	ENDB	Dombås	Norway	Norsk Luftambulanse
Førde Heliport, Central Hospital	ENFD	Førde	Norway	Førde Hospital Trust
Harstad/Narvik Airport, Evenes	ENEV	Evenes	Norway	Avinor
Lørenskog Heliport, Ahus	ENLX	Lørenskog	Norway	Oslo University Hospital
Ringsted Airport	EKRS	Ringsted	Denmark	—
Skive Airport	EKSV	Skive	Denmark	—
Stavanger Heliport, University Hospital	ENSX	Stavanger	Norway	Norsk Luftambulanse
Trondheim Heliport, Rosten	ENRT	Trondheim	Norway	Norsk Luftambulanse

== Bibliography ==
- Andersen, Rune (2007). Når det haster (in Norwegian). Oslo: Orion Forlag. ISBN 978-82-458-0838-4.
- Hagby, Kay (1998). Fra Nielsen & Winther til Boeing 747 (in Norwegian). Drammen: Hagby.
- Ministry of Health and Social Affairs (1998). Luftambulansetjenesten i Norge (PDF) (in Norwegian). Vol. 8. Norwegian Official Report.
