= Bergen Heliport, Grønneviksøren =

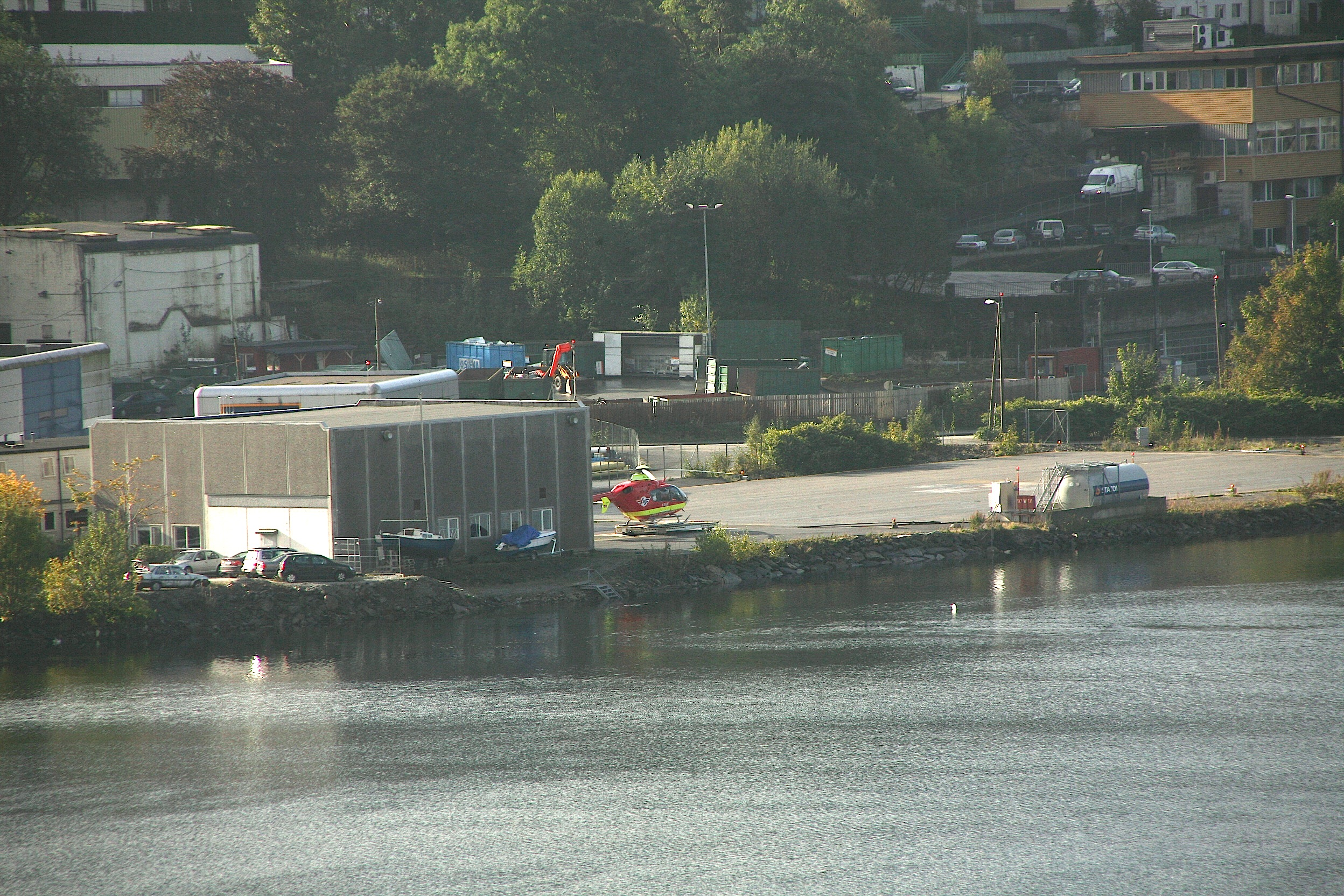
- IATA: none; ICAO: ENBG

Summary
- Airport type: Private
- Owner: Bergen Health Trust
- Operator: Norsk Luftambulanse
- Serves: Bergen, Norway
- Location: Grønneviksøren, Bergen
- Elevation AMSL: 3 m / 10 ft
- Coordinates: 60°22′48″N 5°20′46″E

Map
- Location within Norway

Helipads
Number	Length		Surface
Number	m	ft	Surface
	60	197	Asphalt

Bergen Heliport, Grønneviksøren (ICAO: ENBG; Norwegian: Bergen helikopterplass, Grønneviksøren) is a heliport situated at Grønneviksøren on the shore of Store Lungegårdsvannet in Bergen, Norway. It is solely used for air ambulance services to Haukeland University Hospital. The heliport is owned and operated by Bergen Hospital Trust. It is the base for a Eurocopter EC-135P2+ operated by Norsk Luftambulanse (NLA) for the Norwegian Air Ambulance. Grønneviksøren is also used by the Royal Norwegian Air Force's 330 Squadron's Westland Sea King search and rescue helicopters.

The landing pad measures 60 by 34 meters (197 by 112 ft). Grønneviksøren is located 2 kilometers (1.2 mi) from the hospital and patients must therefore be transported by ambulance to Haukeland. In cases where time is imperative, the helicopters can land at a helipad situated on-site at the hospital.

When the air ambulance service commenced in Bergen in 1987, Bergen Heliport, Nygårdstangen was built. With the lot being sold, the heliport relocated to Grønneviksøren in 2002. Since 2012 it has been supplemented with the helipad at the hospital. There are plans to move the heliport to a new location at Nygårdstangen.

== History ==
Bergen received a helicopter air ambulance service in 1987. It was initially a private initiative operated by NLA, with some grants from the National Insurance Service. This service was initially based at the "Circus lot" at Nygårdstangen. The service was taken over by Airlift in 1994. They started the process of considering Grønneviksøren as a more suitable location.

The original heliport lot was deemed a temporary solution. In 2002 the owner of the lot, Bergen Municipality, signed an option to allow Bergensia Badeland to build a swimming pool at the site. There was a three-month resignation clause in the rental agreement, and Bergen Heath Trust, which had taken over the ownership of the hospital that year, therefore decided that it would need to move the heliport to Grønneviksøren. Also the new lot was municipal. The moving was complicated by the municipality using time on the planning permissions.

The heliport moved from Nygårdstangen to Grønneviksøren in 2002, although this was also stated to be a temporary solution. The same year the ownership of the hospitals in Hordaland, including the base, was transferred to Bergen Hospital Trust. In July the responsibility for the medical staff on the helicopter was moved from NLA to Haukeland. Locating the heliport at Bergen Airport, Flesland was considered, but disregarded due to its remote location form the hospital. In August the municipality gave the go-ahead for the establishment at Grønneviksøren.

Haukeland was the only major hospital without a suitable heliport on-site. They had a temporary structure, although it did not allow good landing conditions and was considered hazardous for flight safety. Only in cases where saving a few minutes was imperative did helicopters call directly at the hospital. The facility lack authorization from the Civil Aviation Authority of Norway, and could only be used on a case-for-case basis when the physician declared necessity.

When the central block was built during the 1980s, there were originally plans to place a helipad on the roof. However, there was uncertainty if there was sufficient support in the structure and the plans were therefore aborted. The Civil Aviation Authority approved the design and construction in 2004, but not until 2008 did Bergen Hospital Trust approve the plans. The official opening of the new pad took place on 12 April 2012.

Originally the new helipad received a concession for 400 aircraft movements per year. Bergen Hospital Trust has applied to increase this to 1,600, after there had been more than 800 movements the first year.

== Facilities ==
The heliport is situated at Grønneviksøren on the southern shore of Store Lungegårdsvannet in the Årstad borough of Bergen. It is situated at an elevation of 3.1 meters (10 ft) above mean sea level. The heliport is situated at Møllendalsveien 34. It features a single landing pad, which measures 60 by 34 meters (197 by 112 ft), a hangar, a fuel tank and offices.

The aerodrome is owned by Bergen Health Trust on municipal land. The operation of the heliport is carried out by Norsk Luftambulanse. They have won the tender to operate the ambulances with the Norwegian Air Ambulance. They have a Eurocopter EC-135P2+ based at Grønneviksøren. Bergen Health Trust has the medical responsibility and medical staff are provided by Haukeland University Hospital. The base is on around-the-clock standby. It is situated 2 kilometers (1.2 mi) from the hospital, a distance which must be transported by ambulance.

Bergen Heliport, Grønneviksøren is exclusively used for air ambulance services. In addition to the helicopter based at the heliport, it serves other ambulance helicopters and search and rescue helicopters of the Royal Norwegian Air Force's 330 Squadron. About sixty percent of all air ambulance missions to Haukeland land at Grønneviksøren, the remainder directly targeting the hospital. The ambulance ride increases travel time by ten to fifteen minutes and the physician on board will make the decision based on the condition of the patient.

Because Haukeland is situated in a residential area, the noise pollution for landings is significant. The Civil Aviation Authority has in its concession limited the number of aircraft movements at the hospital to 400 per year, which forces Haukeland to revert the majority of flights to Grønneviksøren. However, helicopters which arrive from Rogaland and Sogn og Fjordane normally need to refuel before returning and therefore have to also land at Grønneviksøren before returning. Local helicopters need to return to base at Grønneviksøren. There is some noise pollution at Grønneviksøren, although it is significantly smaller than at the hospital.
