= Dombås Heliport, Brunshaugen =

- IATA: none; ICAO: ENDB

Summary
- Airport type: Private
- Owner: Innlandet Hospital Trust
- Operator: Norsk Luftambulanse
- Serves: Dombås, Norway
- Location: Brunshaugen, Dovre Municipality
- Coordinates: 62.06863°N 9.12091°E

Map
- Location within Norway

Helipads
Number	Length		Surface
Number	m	ft	Surface
			Asphalt

Dombås Heliport, Brunshaugen (ICAO: ENDB; Norwegian: Dombås helikopterplass, Brunshaugen) is a heliport situated in Dombås in Dovre Municipality, Norway. Used exclusively for air ambulance missions, it serves as a base for a Eurocopter EC-135P2+ operated by Norsk Luftambulanse on contract with the National Air Ambulance Service of Norway. The facility is owned by Innlandet Hospital Trust. The base in Dombås opened in 1988 and it moved to the current location in 1991.

== History ==
During the 1980s NLA set up an annual Easter base in a winter resort in the mountains of Southern Norway. The first was in Beitostølen in 1982. The following years this base was situated at Rjukan; Dombås; Fagernes Airport, Leirin; and Geilo Airport, Dagali, respectively. In 1985 NLA set up a temporary base in Lesja Municipality to serve the National Shooting Competition. This spurred a public debate about the issue. A major concern was that from Lesja there was 220 kilometers (140 mi) and from Dombås 150 kilometers (93 mi) to the nearest hospital. Local enthusiasts argued that the long distances were more important than high population density in locating new bases. The proposal created a series of demonstrations, especially in Dombås. Several local companies donated money towards building a base.

The Ministry of Health and Social Affairs appointed a commission which in 1986 recommended that a national state-funded helicopter ambulance service be established. Gudbrandsdalen was selected as one of eight bases. Its location allowed large parts of the mountainous interior to be reached, allowing for a national one-hour response time. Next followed a local debate regarding the location within northern Gudbrandsdalen. Eight localities were launched, but soon Dombås was selected due to its centrality.

There was neither time nor funding to build a permanent heliport to begin with, so a temporary facility was erected at the municipal doctor's office. All costs were paid for by the municipalities of Dovre and Lesja. Dombås was one of six new bases to open on 1 January 1988, bringing the national total to eight. Norsk Luftambulanse won the contract to operate the base.

Next work started on the base at Brunshaugen, situated immediately south of the town center. Some of the work was carried out by volunteers and the moving was done by a fleet of volunteers with their tractors. Part of the funding was done through donations. Brunshaugen opened on 8 March 1991. In 1993 there was a new contract tender, and Airlift won the operations out of Dombås. They remained the operator until 2008, when NLA again won the contract.

== Facilities ==
Dombås Heliport is situated at Brunshaugen, immediately south of downtown Dombås. The facility is owned and operated by Innlandet Hospital Trust, part of Southern and Eastern Norway Regional Health Authority. It features a hangar and a single asphalt helipad.

== Operations ==
The ambulance helicopter is operated by Norsk Luftambulanse on contract with the National Air Ambulance Service. They have a Eurocopter EC-135P2+ stationed at the heliport. The helicopter has room for a crew of three, consisting of a pilot, rescue swimming and an anesthesiologist, as well as two stretchers. Medical staff are provided by Innlandet Hospital Trust. The helicopter flew 648 missions lasting 850 hours in 2013.

== Bibliography ==
- Andersen, Rune (2007). Når det haster (in Norwegian). Oslo: Orion Forlag. ISBN 978-82-458-0838-4.
- Ministry of Health, Social Affairs (1998). Luftambulansetjenesten i Norge (PDF) (in Norwegian). Vol. 8.
