= Stavanger Heliport, University Hospital =

- IATA: none; ICAO: ENSX

Summary
- Airport type: Private
- Owner: Stavanger Hospital Trust
- Operator: Norsk Luftambulanse
- Serves: Stavanger, Norway
- Location: Stavanger University Hospital, Våland, Stavanger
- Coordinates: 58.9515°N 5.7307°E

Map
- Location within Norway

Helipads
Number	Length		Surface
Number	m	ft	Surface
Roof	18	59	Asphalt
Ground			Asphalt

Stavanger Heliport, University Hospital (ICAO: ENSX; Norwegian: Stavanger helikopterplass, Universitetssykehuset) is a heliport situated on the premises of Stavanger University Hospital in the Våland neighborhood of the city of Stavanger in Stavanger Municipality in Rogaland county, Norway. Used exclusively for air ambulance services, it is home to a Eurocopter EC-135P2+ operated by Norsk Luftambulanse (NLA) on contract with the National Air Ambulance Service. The base is owned by Stavanger Hospital Trust. When it opened in 1981, it was the second such base in the country.

== History ==
Sola Air Station, located close to the airport, was one of the four inaugural bases of the 330 Squadron. Since 1973 it has been the home of a detachment of Westland Sea King search and rescue helicopters. When needed, this could also be used for ambulance missions.

Norsk Luftambulanse was founded in 1977 as a charitable ambulance helicopter operator. The following year it opened its first base, Lørenskog Heliport, Central Hospital, situated 20 kilometers (12 mi) from central Oslo.

At the time the establishment of a helicopter ambulance service was controversial. In addition to the high operating costs, each base required to have an anesthesiologist on duty at any given time. The Ministry of Social Affairs therefore concluded that establishment of such a service did not constitute effective use of public resources and opposed its establishment. Funding was therefore carried out through donations to NLA.

Locally in Rogaland there was a mix of positions. Twenty-three municipalities in the counties of Rogaland, Hordaland and Vest-Agder supported the initiative from NLA and awarded funding. Rogaland County Municipality, then the operator of Rogaland Central Hospital, had no objections to the establishment of the base, but were not willing to provide funding. Many physicians at the hospital opposed the establishment. Their main concern was that it would drain human resources which could be better used at the emergency department. To fund the establishment, NLA largely approached private companies and asked for charitable donations.

The base opened on 4 June 1981 as Stavanger Heliport, Central Hospital, originally with a Messerschmitt-Bölkow-Blohm Bo 105 helicopter. The funding was taken over by National Air Ambulance Service in 1988.

As of 2013 there are several limitations to the base. The Sea Kings can only land in critical situations due to an insufficient safety area. The hospital is working on plans for a future base. This could result in a split solution, where there is a simple helipad next to the emergency department and a base further away.

== Facilities ==
The heliport is located centrally within the facilities of Stavanger University Hospital. It consists of a combined office and hangar building. There are two helipads, the main one is situated on the roof of the base and is connected, although 100 meters (330 ft) away, from the emergency department. The second is at street level in front of the hangar. The latter requires an ambulance to freight passengers to the ward.

The roof asphalt helipad measures 18.3 meters (60 ft). It is limited to landing weights of 10 tonnes (9.8 long tons; 11 short tons). The facility is owned and operated by Stavanger Hospital Trust, part of Western Norway Regional Health Authority.

== Operations ==
The ambulance helicopters are operated by Norsk Luftambulanse on contract with the National Air Ambulance Service. They have a Eurocopter EC-135P2+ stationed at the heliport. It has room for a crew of three, consisting of a pilot, rescue swimming and an anesthesiologist, as well as two stretchers. Medical staff are provided by Stavanger University Hospital. The helicopter flew 950 missions lasting 604 hours in 2013. The 330 Squadron had an average 101 annual landings in the period from 2005 to 2011.

== Bibliography ==
- Andersen, Rune (2007). Når det haster (in Norwegian). Oslo: Orion Forlag. ISBN 978-82-458-0838-4.
- Duvsete, Svein (2004). Kalde krigere og barmhjertige samartaner (in Norwegian). Oslo: Aschehoug. ISBN 82-03-22071-1.
