= Bergen Heliport, Nygårdstangen =

- IATA: none; ICAO: ENBG

Summary
- Airport type: Private
- Owner: Hordaland County Municipality
- Operator: Norsk Luftambulanse
- Serves: Bergen, Norway
- Location: Nygårdstangen, Bergen
- Elevation AMSL: 3 m / 10 ft
- Coordinates: 60°22′48″N 5°20′46″E

Map
- Location within Norway

Helipads
Number	Length		Surface
Number	m	ft	Surface
	60	197	Asphalt

Bergen Heliport, Nygårdstangen (ICAO: ENBG; Norwegian: Bergen helikopterplass, Nygårdstangen) was a heliport situated at Nygårdstangen on the shore of Store Lungegårdsvannet in Bergen, Norway. It was solely used for air ambulance services to Haukeland University Hospital. The heliport was owned and operated by Hordaland County Municipality, with helicopter services provided by Norsk Luftambulanse (NLA). The base opened in 1987 as a temporary facility. It was closed in 2002 and replaced by Bergen Heliport, Grønneviksøren.

== History ==
Proposals for a helicopter ambulance in Bergen took form during the 1980s. There were two movements. One was based on private initiative backed by NLA. The other was the government. The first commission to look at Bergen in such a capacity was appointed in 1982. It recommended Bergen as a natural site of a base. This led to the establishment of the National Air Ambulance Service from 1 January 1988. Bergen became one of eight cities to receive an air ambulance.

When the Central Block of Haukeland was built during the 1980s, there were originally plans to place a helipad on the roof. However, there was uncertainty if there was sufficient support in the structure and the plans were therefore aborted. Another concern, for both a helipad at the hospital and at a location near Store Lungegårdsvannet, was noise pollution.

A suitable location at Haukeland was not established, instead the heliport was located on the "Circus lot" at Nygårdstangen. NLA was awarded the first contract to operate the helicopters, originally with a Messerschmitt-Bölkow-Blohm Bo 105 helicopter.

The service was taken over by Airlift in 1994. They started the process of considering Grønneviksøren as a more suitable location. Hordaland County Municipality, then responsible for the hospitals, took over operations of the base in 1996. NLA later won back the operational responsibilities for the helicopters.

The original heliport lot was deemed a temporary solution. In 2002 the owner of the lot, Bergen Municipality, signed an option to allow Bergensia Badeland to build a swimming pool at the site. There was a three-month resignation clause in the rental agreement, and Bergen Heath Trust, which had taken over the ownership of the hospital that year, therefore decided that it would need to move the heliport to Grønneviksøren. Also the new lot was municipal. The moving was complicated by the municipality using time on the planning permissions.

The heliport moved from Nygårdstangen to Grønneviksøren in 2002, although this was also stated to be a temporary solution. The same year the ownership of the hospitals in Hordaland, including the base, was transferred to Bergen Hospital Trust. In July the responsibility for the medical staff on the helicopter was moved from NLA to Haukeland. Locating the heliport at Bergen Airport, Flesland was considered, but disregarded due to its remote location form the hospital. In August the municipality gave the go-ahead for the establishment at Grønneviksøren.

== Facilities ==
The heliport was located at the "Circus lot" on Nygårdstangen. It was a temporary and rudimentary structure. Originally it consisted of a series of camping wagons used as offices and with the crew stationed in a hotel. Later a series of builder's sheds were constructed. It had a single helipad.

== Operations ==
The position involved patients having to transfer to an ambulance and spent ten minutes in transit to the hospital. Although a disadvantage for helicopter patients, it allowed the anesthesiologist on duty to be on call for emergencies in the vicinity by car. Located only minutes from the city center, this allowed for quick responses to accidents and emergencies downtown.

== Bibliography ==
- Andersen, Rune (2007). Når det haster (in Norwegian). Oslo: Orion Forlag. ISBN 978-82-458-0838-4.
