= Møre og Romsdal Hospital Trust =

Health trust in Norway

Møre og Romsdal Hospital Trust (Norwegian: Helse Møre og Romsdal HF) is a health trust which covers Møre og Romsdal, Norway. The trust is owned by Central Norway Regional Health Authority and is headquartered in Ålesund. It operates four hospitals: Kristiansund Hospital, Molde Hospital, Ålesund Hospital and Volda Hospital. The agency was created on 1 July 2011 when Nordmøre og Romsdal Hospital Trust and Sunnmøre Hospital Trust were merged.
