= Lørenskog Heliport, Ahus =

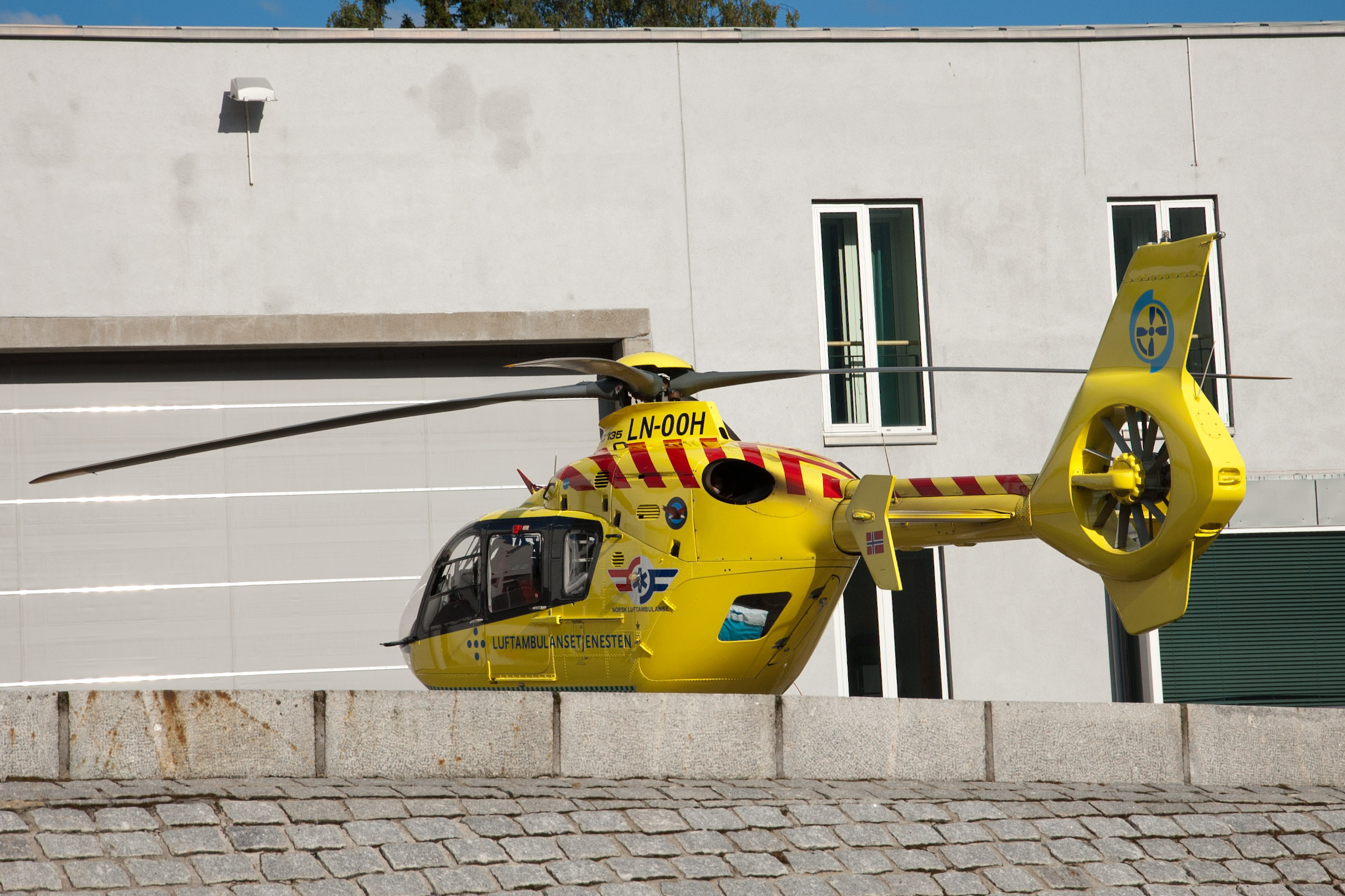
- Eurocopter EC-135P2+
- IATA: none; ICAO: ENLX

Summary
- Airport type: Private
- Owner: Oslo University Hospital
- Operator: Norsk Luftambulanse
- Serves: Lørenskog, Norway
- Location: Akershus University Hospital, Lørenskog
- Coordinates: 59°55′56″N 10°59′13″E

Map
- Location within Norway

Helipads
Number	Length		Surface
Number	m	ft	Surface
	20	66	Asphalt

Lørenskog Heliport, Ahus (ICAO: ENLX; Norwegian: Lørenskog helikopterplass, Ahus) is a heliport situated on the premises of Akershus University Hospital (Ahus) in Lørenskog, Norway. It serves as the main base for air ambulance helicopters in the central part of Eastern Norway. It is a base for a Eurocopter EC-135P2+ and a Eurocopter EC145 T2, both operated by Norsk Luftambulanse (NLA). The base became the first permanent ambulance heliport in the country when it opened in 1978. The facility is owned by Oslo University Hospital.

== History ==
After NLA was founded in 1977, it started working to establish a permanent ambulance helicopter base in the central parts of Eastern Norway. Initially the foundation started fund-raising to run a one-year trial with a helicopter based near Oslo. The proposal was rejected by the Ministry of Social Affairs, which stated that the need for such a service would be primarily in remote locations and that an equal service for the whole country would have to be established for state funding.

As a promotional stunt, NLA allied with the Norwegian Automobile Federation (NAF) and brought an ADAC helicopter to various sites in Eastern Norway. By indicated that each location was a possible candidate for a base, they were able to garnish support from the various local newspapers. However, NAF did not have funds to follow through on the project and pulled out.

Norsk Luftambulanse started discussions with Akershus County Municipality, who were positive to the service. This resulted in Akershus Central Hospital (SiA, today Ahus) being selected as the initial base. NLA's first helicopter was a Messerschmitt-Bölkow-Blohm Bo 105 which was leased from the manufacturer and named Bård 1. To aid funding, it received advertisements. The base was inaugurated on 7 June 1978 as Lørenskog Heliport, Central Hospital.

The initial base was a simple structure consisting of a plastic hangar and a small room at the hospital. The crew received dorms in a nearby dormitory. NLA did not have an air operator's certificate to begin with and subcontracted operations to Mørefly. High operating costs caused NLA to switch operators to Partnair from 1 May 1979. They proposed moving the base to Oslo Airport, Fornebu to cut costs, but this was rejected. In its first year of operation, the base carried out 216 missions. Until Stavanger Heliport, Central Hospital opened in 1981, Lørenskog was the only ambulance helicopter base in Norway.

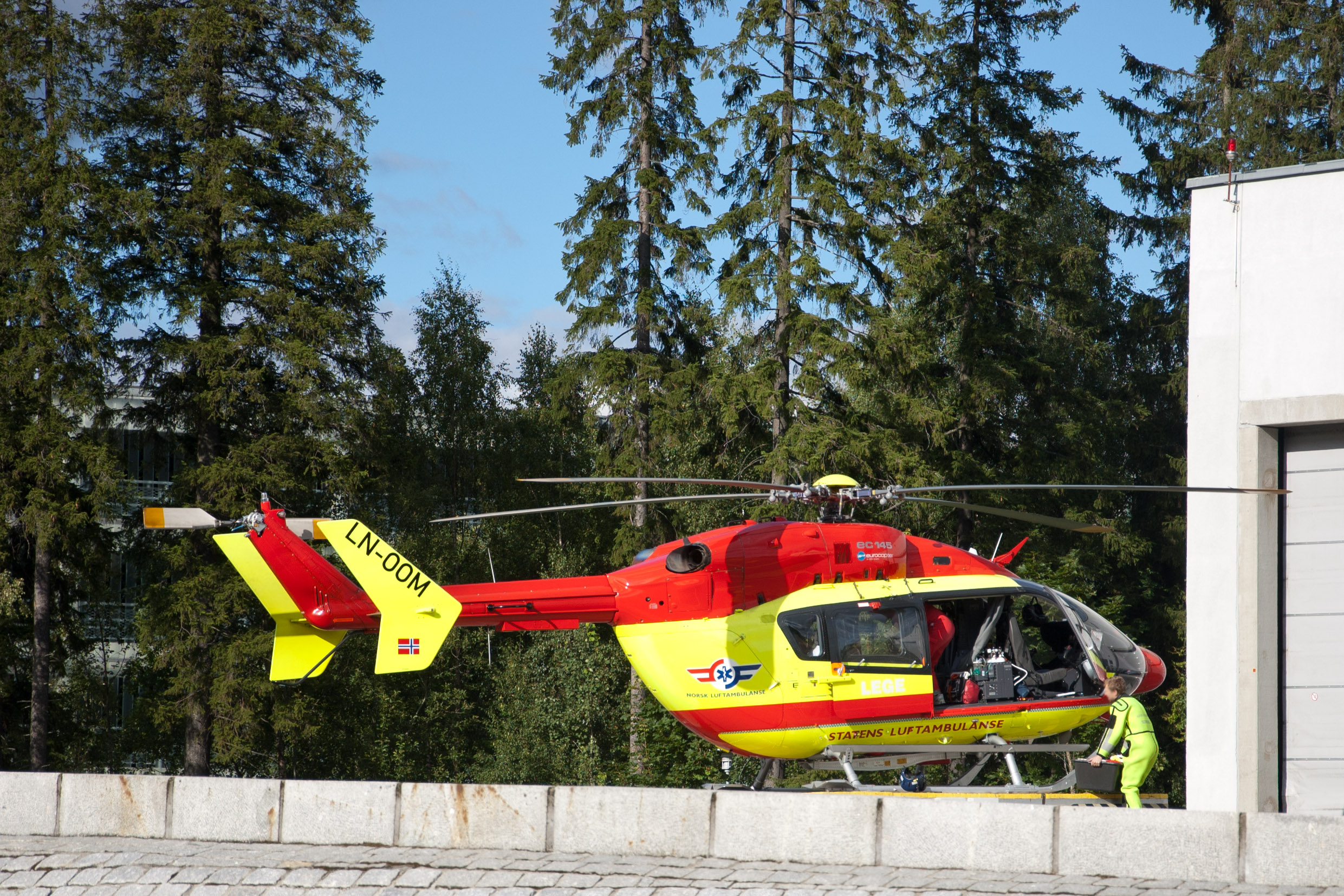
The Eurocopter EC145 T2

The original base had limited facilities and long distances between the crew rooms and the helicopter. This caused the need for a new, compact base, which opened in November 1987. NLA located its Global Medical Services to the heliport. The division was responsible for handling international calls from members regarding medical questions. It was moved to Ullevål University Hospital in Oslo in 2002. With the opening of the new Ahus in 2008, a new, integrated base was built, allowing the heliport to administratively integrated into the emergency department of the hospital.

== Facilities ==
The heliport is located on the outskirts of Akershus University Hospital, about 300 meters (980 ft) from the emergency department. The asphalt heliport tarmac measures 20.55 meters (67.4 ft). The facilities include a hangar for two helicopters and a fuel tank. The facility is owned and operated by Innlandet Hospital Trust, part of Southern and Eastern Norway Regional Health Authority. It features a hangar and a single asphalt helipad.

The heliport is situated about 20 kilometers (12 mi) from downtown Oslo, where the helicopters can reach Ullevål University Hospital and Rikshospitalet, neither of which have a base for helicopters.

== Operations ==
Lørenskog is the only base in Norway which operates two ambulance helicopters. The ambulance helicopters are operated by Norsk Luftambulanse on contract with the National Air Ambulance Service. They have a Eurocopter EC-135P2+ and a larger Eurocopter EC145 T2 stationed at the heliport. The EC-135 has room for a crew of three, consisting of a pilot, rescue swimming and an anesthesiologist, as well as two stretchers. Medical staff are provided by Oslo University Hospital. The helicopters flew 2197 missions lasting 1596 hours in 2013.

== Bibliography ==
- Andersen, Rune (2007). Når det haster (in Norwegian). Oslo: Orion Forlag. ISBN 978-82-458-0838-4.
