= Norwegian Scientific Committee for Food and Environment =

The Norwegian Scientific Committee for Food and Environment
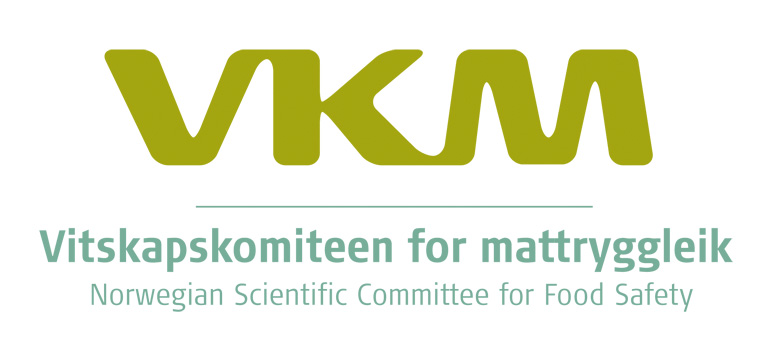
- Company type: Government agency
- Industry: Food safety
- Founded: 2004
- Headquarters: Sandakerveien 24 C, Oslo, Norway
- Key people: Harald Gjein (Director)
- Owner: Norwegian Ministry of Health and Care Services
- Number of employees: 25 (2021)
- Website: VKM.no

The Norwegian Scientific Committee for Food and Environment (VKM) (Norwegian: Vitenskapskomiteen for mat og miljø) conducts open, independent, scientific risk assessments regarding safe food, food production and the environment upon request of the Norwegian Food Safety Authority and the Norwegian Environment Agency. VKM also carries out risk assessments on animal health, plant health, animal welfare and cosmetics for the Norwegian Food Safety Authority, and on microbiological products and alien organisms and trade in endangered species (CITES) upon request from the Norwegian Environment Agency. In addition, the Committee makes environmental risk assessments of genetically modified organisms for the Norwegian Environment Agency. The assessments are used as a basis for knowledge of the various ministries in Norway. The assessments also provide a basis for knowledge which the Norwegian Food Safety Authority uses to provide advice and determine regulations. The committee may raise matters on its own initiative. Risk assessments are made on an independent basis in accordance with internationally established methods. The scientific committee itself is to carry out risk assessments on their own initiative. The risk assessments are used by the Norwegian Food Safety Authority and the Norwegian Environment Agency when giving advice to Norwegian ministries, and when the Norwegian Food Safety Authority is developing new laws and regulations.

Administratively, VKM is subject to the Norwegian Institute of Public Health. The Scientific Committee is appointed by the Ministry of Health and Care Services for four years at a time. About 100 experts from scientific institutions in the Nordic countries are members of the committee. They are appointed by virtue of their professional expertise and not based on where they are employed. VKM consists of a main committee and eleven expert panels. The main committee deals with general and fundamental issues, interdisciplinary issues and questions that fall outside the expert panels. Work on risk assessments is carried out by VKM's expert panels. If necessary, external experts are consulted. A scientific secretariat is responsible for day-to-day operations.

VKM is the Norwegian focal point for the European Food Safety Authority. (EFSA) EFSA is responsible for scientific advice on food safety and scientific risk assessments on request from the European Commission, the European Parliament and the EU Member States.
