= Trondheim Heliport, Rosten =

- IATA: none; ICAO: ENRT

Summary
- Airport type: Private
- Operator: Norsk Luftambulanse
- Serves: Trondheim, Norway
- Location: Rosten, Trondheim
- Coordinates: 63.368°N 10.374°E

Map
- Location within Norway

Helipads
Number	Length		Surface
Number	m	ft	Surface
			Asphalt

Trondheim Heliport, Rosten (ICAO: ENRT; Norwegian: Trondheim helikopterplass, Rosten) is a heliport situated in Vestre Rosten in the Tiller neighborhood of Trondheim Norway. Used exclusively for air ambulance missions, it serves as a base for a Eurocopter EC-135P2+ operated by Norsk Luftambulanse (NLA) on contract with the National Air Ambulance Service. The original heliport was situated at Brøset Hospital and opened in 1988. The base moved to Vestre Rosten in the mid 1990s.

== History ==
Trøndelag was amongst the areas in Norway with the best coverage of Westland Sea King search and rescue helicopters following the establishment of the 330 Squadron at Ørland Main Air Station in 1973. The first helicopter ambulance service in Trondheim was established by Lufttransport in February 1981. They stationed a helicopter at Trondheim Regional Hospital (today St. Olav's) in the hopes that they could sell flight hours to either the hospital or other contractors. However, no missions were requisitioned.

The Ministry of Health and Social Affairs appointed a commission which in 1986 recommended that a national state-funded helicopter ambulance service be established. There was a major debate in Trondheim if this was a necessary investment. The previous attempt showed little use and the rescue helicopters served the region well. NLA became active in supporting an air ambulance service. Based on the commission's report, Trondheim was selected as one of eight bases starting 1 January 1988.

The first base in Trondheim was situated at Brøset Hospital, a psychiatric hospital near Leangen. The base was rudimentary. An old stable was rebuilt as a garage and a simple plastic hangar was built for the helicopter. Norsk Luftambulanse won the contract to operate the base, originally using a Messerschmitt-Bölkow-Blohm Bo 105 helicopter.

There had been calls for the base to be built at the regional hospital, but there was not place for the service there. Instead a permanent base was built at Vestre Rosten at Tiller. As part of the construction of the new St. Olav's University Hospital, a helipad was opened at the hospital on 1 February 2010. It allows direct access to the emergency department and allows for helicopters to refuel.

== Facilities ==
The heliport is situated in Vestre Rosten in the Tiller neighborhood of Trondheim. The facility is owned and operated by NLA. It consists of an asphalt helipad, a hangar connected to an office building.

== Operations ==
The ambulance helicopter is operated by Norsk Luftambulanse on contract with the National Air Ambulance Service. They have a Eurocopter EC-135P2+ stationed at the heliport. The helicopter has room for a crew of three, consisting of a pilot, rescue swimming and an anesthesiologist, as well as two stretchers. Medical staff are provided by St. Olav's University Hospital, part of St. Olav's Hospital Trust. The helicopter flew 893 missions lasting 726 hours in 2013.

== Bibliography ==
- Andersen, Rune (2007). Når det haster (in Norwegian). Oslo: Orion Forlag. ISBN 978-82-458-0838-4.
- Duvsete, Svein (2004). Kalde krigere og barmhjertige samartaner (in Norwegian). Oslo: Aschehoug. ISBN 82-03-22071-1.
- Ministry of Health, Social Affairs (1998). Luftambulansetjenesten i Norge (PDF) (in Norwegian). Vol. 8.
