= Haukeland University Hospital =

- Bergen Hospital Trust

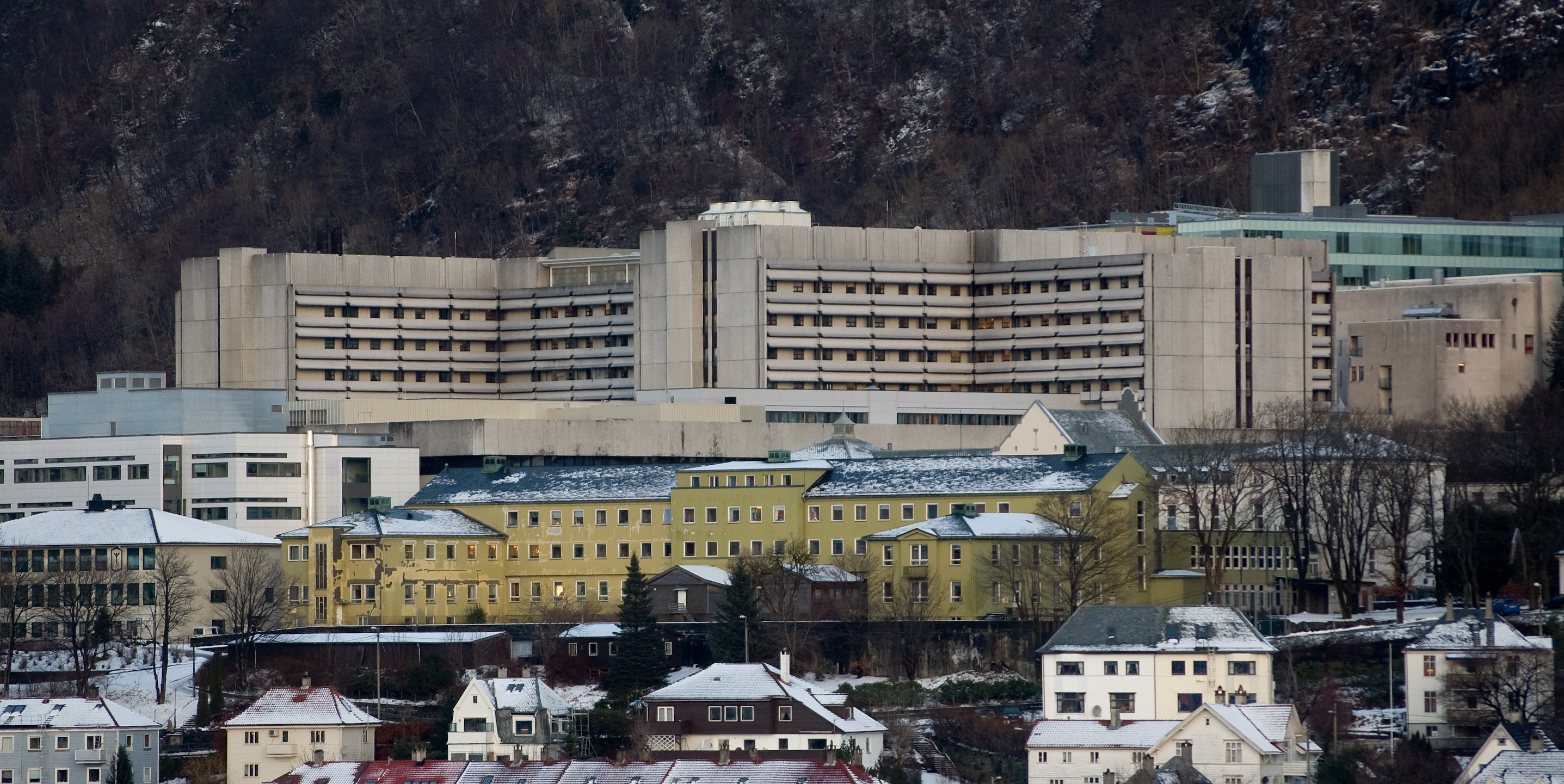

Geography
- Location: Haukeland, Bergen, Hordaland, Norway
- Coordinates: 60.374°N 5.3587°E

Organisation
- Care system: Public
- Type: University hospital
- Affiliated university: University of Bergen

Services
- Emergency department: Yes
- Beds: 1100

Helipads
- Helipad: On-site and at Bergen Heliport, Grønneviksøren

History
- Founded: 1912

Links
- Website: https://www.helse-bergen.no/en/ (English)
- Lists: Hospitals in Norway

Haukeland University Hospital (Norwegian: Haukeland universitetssjukehus) is a hospital in Bergen, Norway, and one of the eleven institutions that make up Bergen Hospital Trust. Haukeland is the largest in Norway in terms of number of patients, and serves as the local hospital of Bergen, Midthordland and Nordhordland, the central hospital of Vestland county, and the regional hospital for Vestland and Rogaland counties.

The general area of the hospital is about 200,000 square metres (2,200,000 sq ft) and the Central Block is about 125,000 square metres (1,350,000 sq ft). They have a partnership with the University of Bergen, including the Gades Institute of Pathology. The Hospital is the largest employer in Hordaland by number of employees. Haukeland is a national special hospital and resource center for burn injuries, air-pressure injuries (diving), corneal transplants and the treatment of intracranial tumors. It is the site of RELIS.

== Application for distribution of heroin ==
The hospital's 2013 application for distributing heroin for free, was the first ever by a Norwegian hospital. Distribution is planned at the proposed supervised injection site at the new emergency department at Solheimsviken. Such injection sites have not been permitted by the city council, although the hospital trust may independent of this implement injection rooms.

== Heliport ==
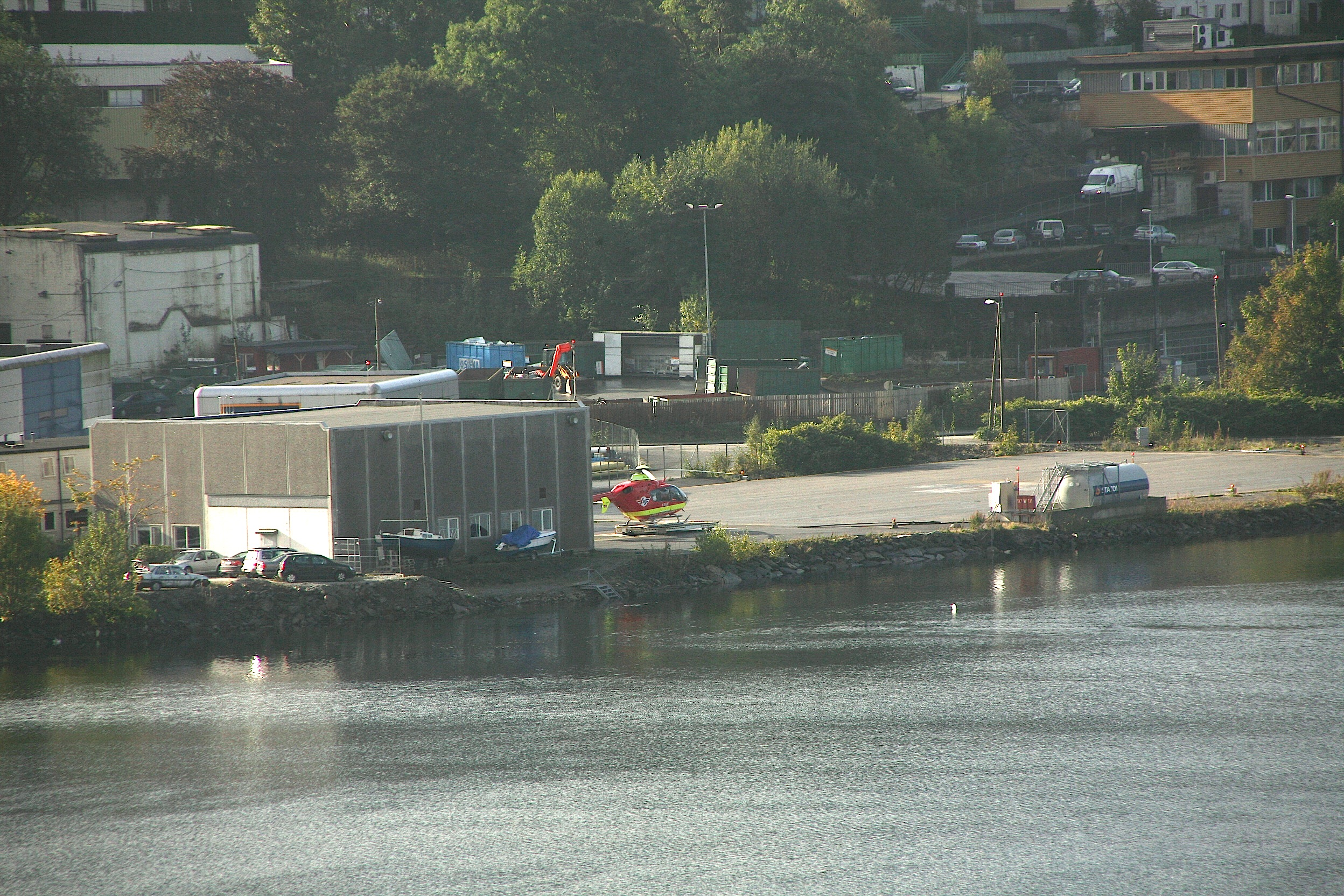
Bergen Heliport, Grønneviksøren acts as the base for the air ambulance for Haukeland

Bergen received a helicopter air ambulance service in 1987, operated by Norsk Luftambulanse. This service was initially based at the "Circus lot" at Nygårdstangen. When the central block was built during the 1980s, there were originally plans to place a helipad on the roof. However, there was uncertainty if there was sufficient support in the structure and the plans were therefore aborted. Haukeland was the only major hospital without a suitable heliport on-site. They had a temporary structure, although it did not allow good landing conditions and was considered hazardous for flight safety. Only in cases where saving a few minutes was imperative did helicopters call directly at the hospital. The facility lack authorization from the Civil Aviation Authority of Norway, and could only be used on a case-for-case basis when the physician declared necessity.

The heliport lot at Nygårdstangen was sold in 2002, and replaced with Bergen Heliport, Grønneviksøren. At the same time Haukeland took over the medical air ambulance staff. The Civil Aviation Authority approved the design and construction of an on-site helipad in 2004, but not until 2008 did Bergen Hospital Trust approve the plans. The official opening of the new pad took place on 12 April 2012.

== Laboratory clinic ==
The new laboratory building opened in 2010. The building lies in the East side of the central building, with a pedestrian bridge connecting the two. In this building, every laboratory field except pathology is located, and the building features a blood bank as well as RELIS, Norway's drug information centre. With its 23 000 square metres, the laboratory building is the largest building raised at Haukeland University Hospital since the central building.

== Gallery ==
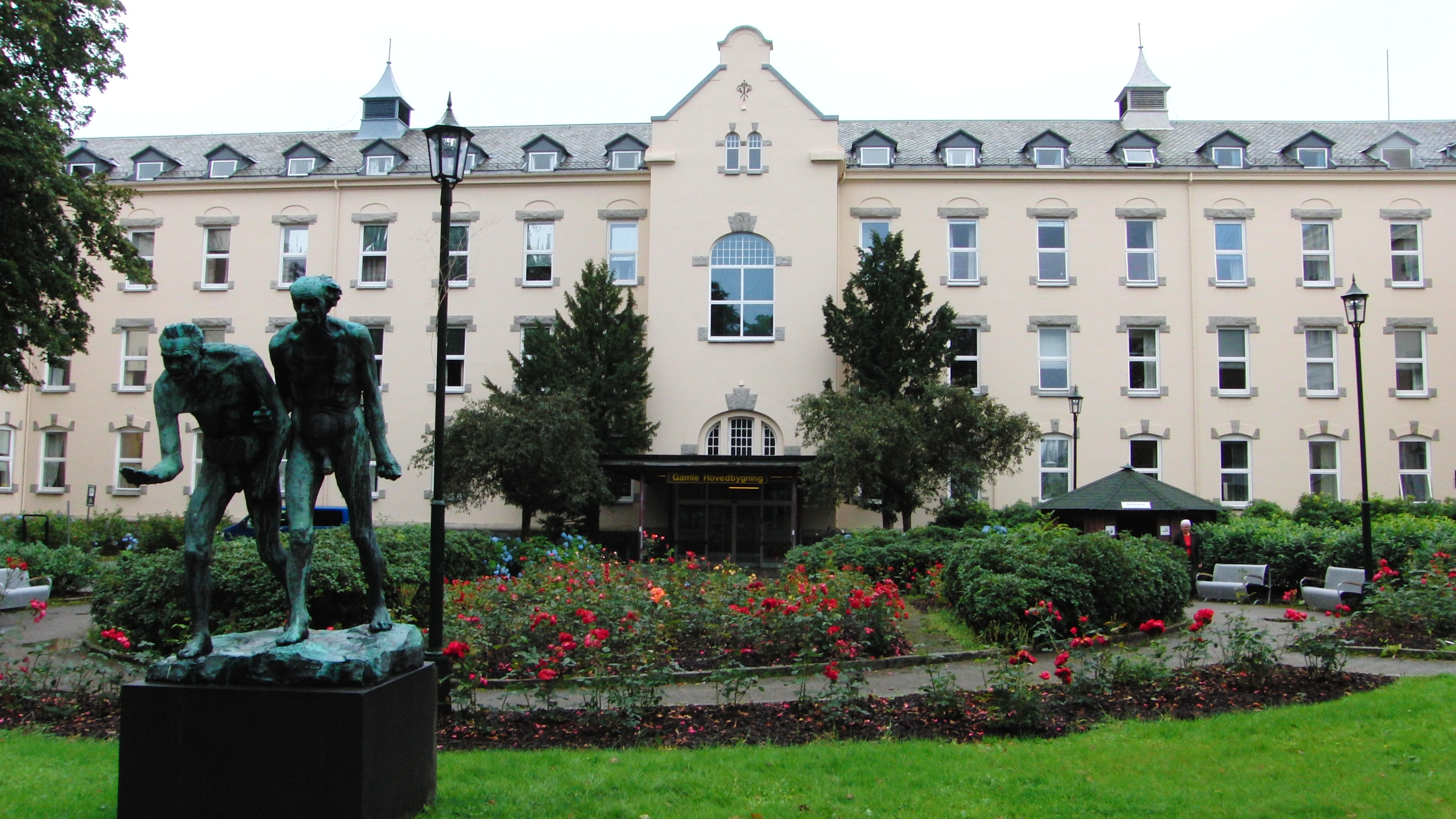
The old main building in 2010

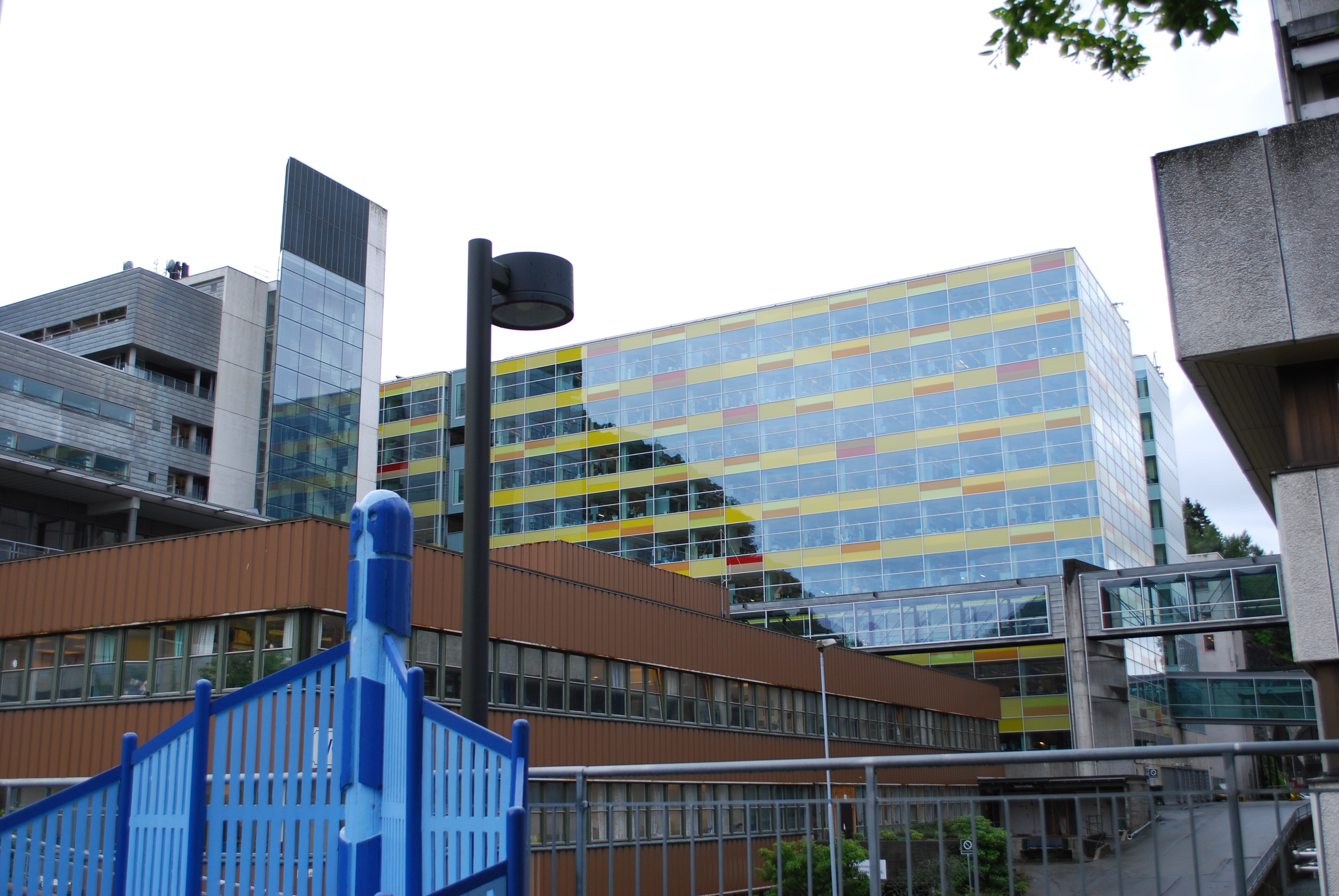
The laboratory building, centre back

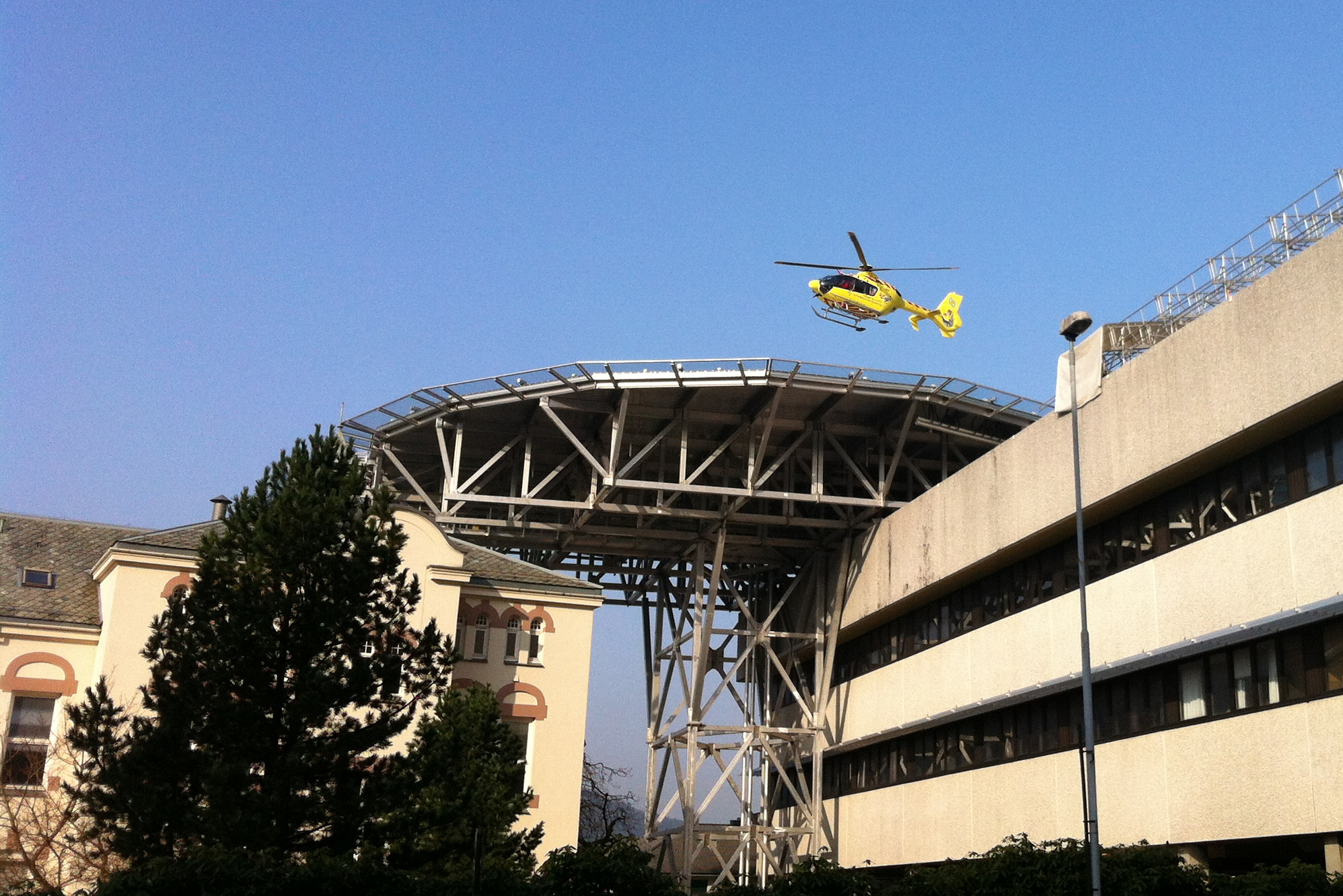
Helipad at Haukeland University Hospital

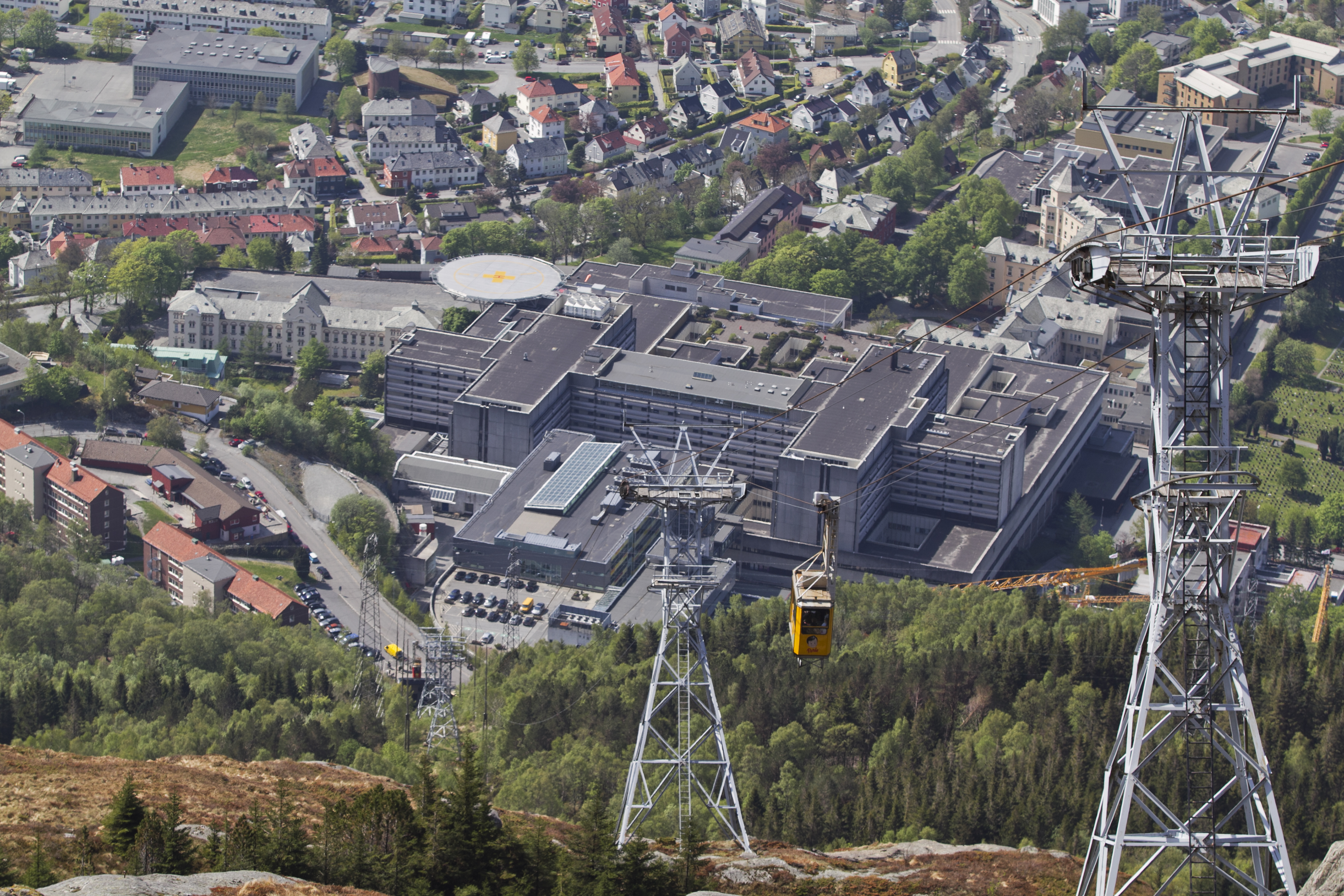
Haukeland hospital

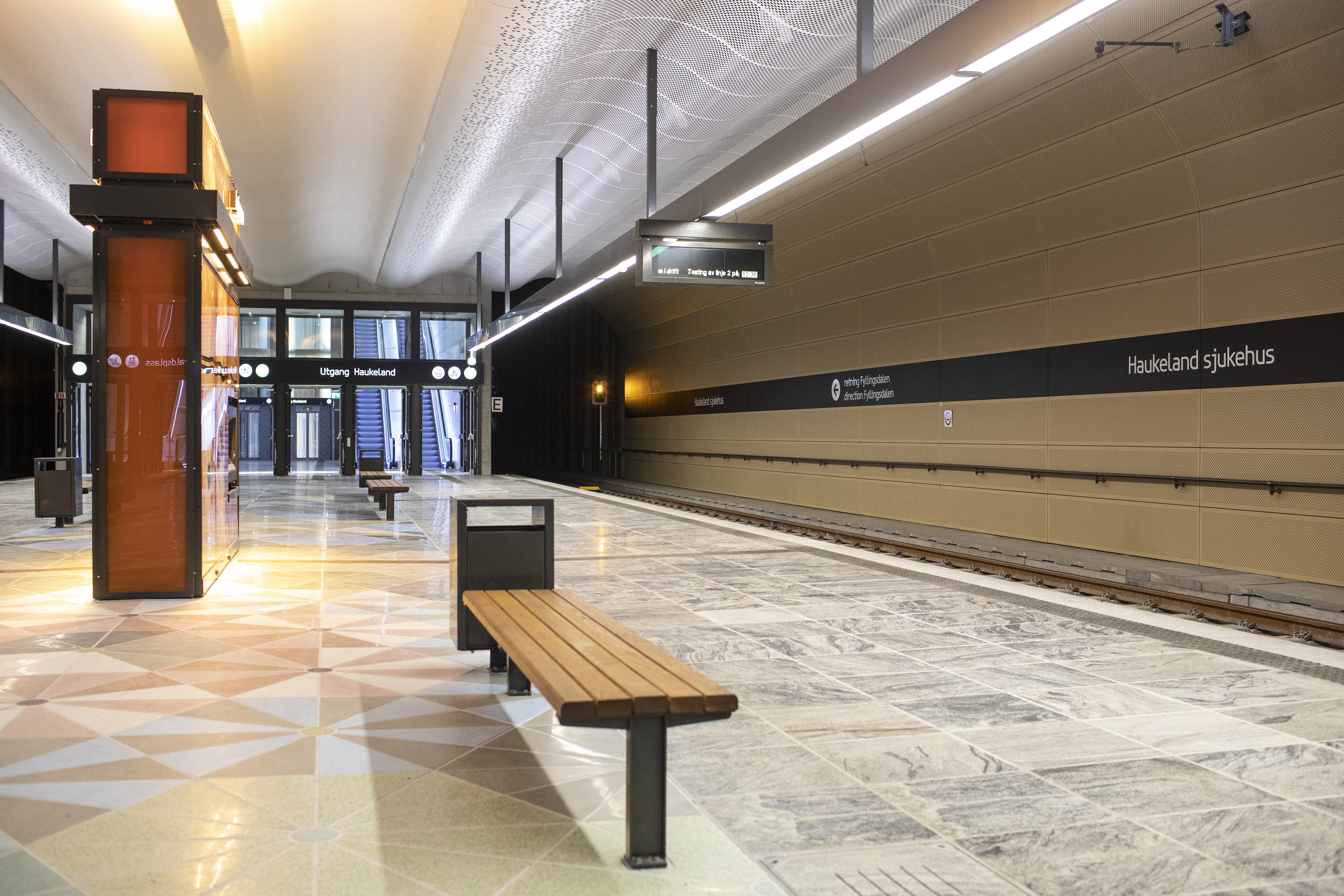
Light rail underground station at Haukeland
