= Norwegian Air Ambulance =

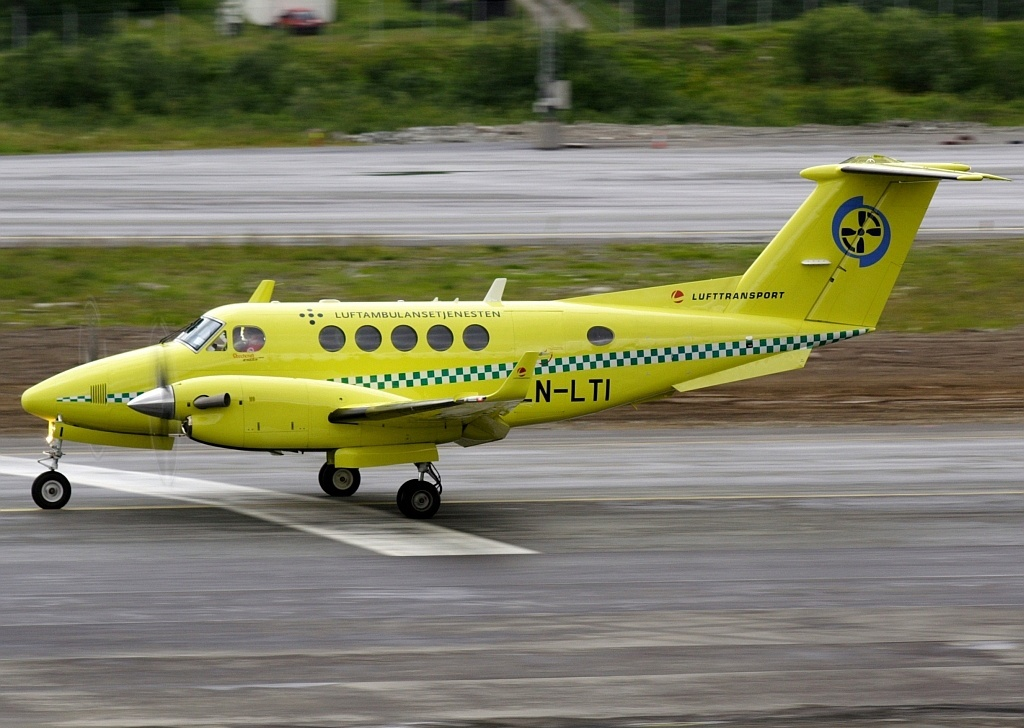
Beechcraft King Air operated by Lufttransport

The Norwegian Air Ambulance Service (Norwegian: Den norske luftambulansetjenesten) is organised through the government owned limited company Luftambulansetjenesten HF (formerly Helseforetakenes Nasjonale Luftambulansetjeneste ANS). The service provides helicopter emergency medical service (HEMS) and fixed-wing air ambulance operations.

Dedicated planes are provided at seven bases, and helicopters at 13. In addition the service depends on the state Search and rescue helicopters for a full national coverage. The fixed-wing aircraft and HEMS helicopters are operated by the private companies Lufttransport and Norsk Luftambulanse on contract for the Air Ambulance Service. The rescue helicopters are operated by the Royal Norwegian Air Force 330 squadron.

== History ==
Air ambulance services in Norway have been operated by private companies and the military since the 1920s, but the first dedicated service came in 1972 when the Air Force 330 squadron was equipped with Westland Sea King helicopters. The helicopters were purchased by the ministry of justice while they were to be operated by the Air Force.

In 1973 the Norwegian government started looking at possible ways to organise an air ambulance service in Norway. Before the government had made a decision, the foundation Norsk Luftambulanse had been founded in 1977 and provided one helicopter from its base in Lørenskog Municipality. In 1983 the government started buying services from the foundation, and in 1988 a nationwide air ambulance service was started where the government bought services from private companies.

By 1993 three companies had established themselves on the domestic air ambulance marked in Norway: Norsk Luftambulanse, Airlift and Lufttransport. In 2002 Norsk Luftambulanse bought the air ambulance operation from Airlift, and merged the operations. In April 2006 the Air Ambulance Service extended its contracts with Norsk Luftambulanse and Lufttransport until 2014.

== Operations ==
=== Helicopter emergency medical service ===
The helicopter ambulances are located on heliports at 11 hospitals around the country. The helicopters are operated by the private companies Lufttransport and Norsk Luftambulanse. Lufttransport operates a total of 10 AgustaWestland AW139 while Norsk Luftambulanse operates a total of 14 Airbus H135-T3 and H145-T2 for the service.

Helicopters are stationed at the hospitals in Arendal, Bergen, Brønnøysund, Dombås, Evenes, Førde, Lørenskog, Stavanger, Tromsø, Trondheim, Ål and Ålesund. The helicopters must be airborne within 15 minutes.

=== Fixed-wing ambulances ===
Plane ambulances are stationed at six airports in Norway. The service is provided by Lufttransport with 12 Beech King Air B200 aircraft. The airplanes are stationed at Alta Airport, Bodø Airport, Brønnøysund Airport, Gardermoen, Tromsø Airport, Kirkenes and Ålesund Airport.

=== Search and rescue helicopters ===
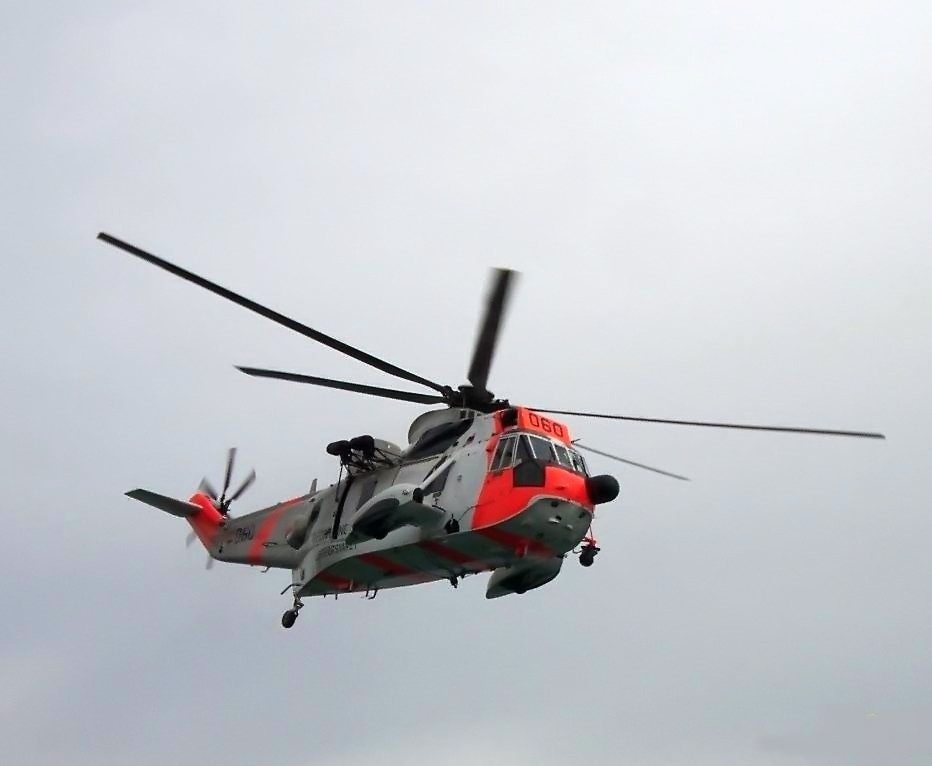
A Westland Sea King helicopter operated by the 330 Squadron

The Air Force 330 squadron has its headquarters at Sola Air Station outside Stavanger. The squadron operates out of four military airports: Sola Air Station, Ørland Main Air Station, Bodø Main Air Station, Banak Air Station and Rygge Air Station.

The squadron operates 12 Sea King helicopters and had 1,038 operations in 2005. RNOAF 330 Squadron is in the process of retiring its Westland Sea Kings, and replace them with Augusta Westland AW-101. As of late 2022, they have received 11 out of 16 AW-101s.

At any given time the 330 squadron has six helicopters on 15 minutes readiness, one at each station. The helicopters are under command of the Joint Rescue Coordination Centre of Southern Norway located in Sola Municipality which is responsible for Southern Norway (Rygge, Sola, Florø and Ørland) and the Joint Rescue Coordination Centre of Northern Norway located at Bodø which is responsible for Northern Norway (Bodø and Banak). The primary function is search and rescue (SAR) but several hundred air ambulance missions are undertaken each year.

== See also ==
- Aviation in Norway
