= Ministry of Health and Care Services =

Government ministry of Norway

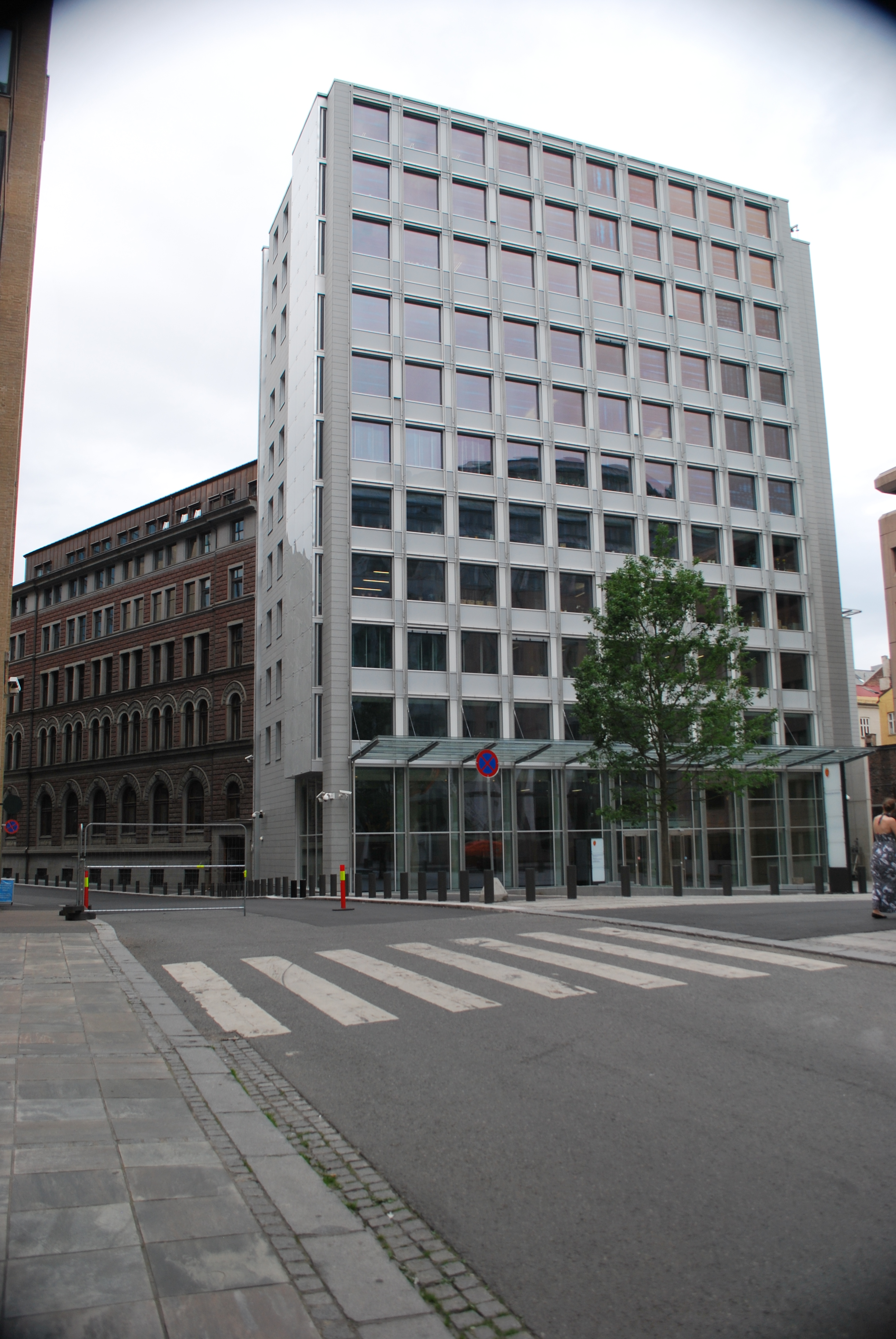

The Royal Norwegian Ministry of Health and Care Services (Helse- og omsorgsdepartementet) is a Norwegian government ministry in charge of health policy, public health, health care services, and health legislation in Norway. It is led by the Minister of Health and Care Services.

More specifically, the Ministry of Health and Care Services has the superior responsibility for providing the population with adequate health care services, including health promotion, based upon the principle of equality and health care services independent of habitation and financial circumstances.

The Minister of Health and Care Services is the head of the Ministry, and its political leader. The position is held by Jan Christian Vestre as of 2025. The Norwegian Board of Health is a national government institution under the Ministry of Health and Care Services.

== Subsidiaries ==
The ministry owns the four regional health authorities in Norway:

- Central Norway Regional Health Authority
- Northern Norway Regional Health Authority
- Southern and Eastern Norway Regional Health Authority
- Western Norway Regional Health Authority

It also is supreme of the following government agencies:

- Norwegian Directorate for Health and Social Affairs
- Norwegian Board of Health Supervision
- Norwegian Institute of Public Health
- Norwegian System of Compensation to Patients
- Norwegian Medicines Agency
- National Institute for Alcohol and Drug Research
- Norwegian Scientific Committee for Food Safety
- Norwegian Radiation Protection Authority
- Norwegian Labour and Welfare Service
- Norwegian Food Safety Authority
- Norwegian Biotechnology Advisory Board
- Statens helsepersonellnemnd
- Norwegian Patients' Injury Compensation Board
- Norwegian Governmental Appeal Board regarding medical treatment abroad
