= List of hospitals in Norway =

This is a list of hospitals in Norway. Norway's national government has authority over hospitals. The country is divided into four health trusts which are in charge of all medical care within each of those regions. Each of the four trust areas oversee several hospital trusts within the region. The hospital trusts run the hospital facilities within a geographical area. Names are given in both English and Norwegian.

Regional Health Authority	Hospital Trust	Hospitals
Northern Norway (Helse Nord RHF)	Finnmark Hospital Trust (Finnmarkssykehuset HF)	Hammerfest Hospital (Hammerfest sykehus); Kirkenes Hospital (Hammerfest sykehus)
Northern Norway (Helse Nord RHF)	Helgeland Hospital Trust (Helgelandssykehuset HF)	Helgeland Hospital Mo i Rana (Helgelandssykehuset Mo i Rana); Helgeland Hospital Mosjøen (Helgelandssykehuset Mosjøen); Helgeland Hospital Sandnessjøen (Helgelandssykehuset Sandnessjøen)
Northern Norway (Helse Nord RHF)	Nordland Hospital Trust (Nordlandssykehuset HF)	Nordland Hospital Bodø (Nordlandssykehuset Bodø); Nordland Hospital Lofoten (Nordlandssykehuset Lofoten); Nordland Hospital Vesterålen (Nordlandssykehuset Vesterålen)
Northern Norway (Helse Nord RHF)	University Hospital of North Norway (Universitetssykehuset Nord-Norge)	UNN Tromsø Hospital (UNN Tromsø sykehus); UNN Harstad Hospital (UNN Harstad sykehus); UNN Narvik Hospital (UNN Narvik sykehus); UNN Longyearbyen Hospital (UNN Longyearbyen sykehus)
Northern Norway (Helse Nord RHF)	Northern Norway Pharmaceutical Trust (Sykehusapotek Nord HF)	The Pharmacy Trust operates pharmacies in the following hospitals: UNN Tromsø Hospital (UNN Tromsø sykehus); UNN Harstad Hospital (UNN Harstad sykehus); Nordland Hospital Bodø (Nordlandssykehuset Bodø)
Central Norway (Helse Midt-Norge RHF)	Møre og Romsdal Hospital Trust (Helse Møre og Romsdal HF)	Kristiansund Hospital (Kristiansund sjukehus); Molde Hospital (Molde sjukehus); Volda Hospital (Volda sjukehus); Ålesund Hospital (Ålesund sjukehus)
Central Norway (Helse Midt-Norge RHF)	Nord-Trøndelag Hospital Trust (Helse Nord-Trøndelag HF)	Levanger Hospital (Sykehuset Levanger); Namsos Hospital (Sykehuset Namsos)
Central Norway (Helse Midt-Norge RHF)	St. Olav's Hospital Trust (St. Olavs hospital HF)	St. Olav's University Hospital (St Olavs Hospital Universitetssykehuset); Orkdal Hospital (Orkdal sjukehus); Røros Hospital (Røros sykehus)
Central Norway (Helse Midt-Norge RHF)	Central Norway Pharmaceutical Trust (Sykehusapotekene i Midt-Norge HF)	The Pharmacy Trust operates pharmacies in the following hospitals: St. Olav's University Hospital (St Olavs Hospital Universitetssykehuset); Kristiansund Hospital (Kristiansund sjukehus); Levanger Hospital (Sykehuset Levanger); Molde Hospital (Molde sjukehus); Namsos Hospital (Sykehuset Namsos); Ålesund Hospital (Ålesund sjukehus)
Western Norway (Helse Vest RHF)	Bergen Hospital Trust (Helse Bergen HF)	Haukeland University Hospital (Haukeland universitetetssjukehus); Coastal Hospital in Hagevik (Kysthospitalet i Hagevik); Sandviken Hospital (Sandviken sjukehus); Voss Hospital (Voss sjukehus)
Western Norway (Helse Vest RHF)	Fonna Hospital Trust (Helse Fonna HF)	Haugesund Hospital (Haugesund sjukehus); Odda Hospital (Odda sjukehus); Stord Hospital (Stord sjukehus); Valen Hospital (Valen sjukehus)
Western Norway (Helse Vest RHF)	Førde Hospital Trust (Helse Førde HF)	Førde Central Hospital (Førde sentralsjukehus); Nordfjord Hospital (Nordfjord sjukehus); Lærdal Hospital (Lærdal sjukehus)
Western Norway (Helse Vest RHF)	Stavanger Hospital Trust (Helse Stavanger HF)	Stavanger University Hospital (Stavanger universitetssjukehus)
Western Norway (Helse Vest RHF)	Western Norway Pharmaceutical Trust (Sjukehusapoteka Vest HF)	The Pharmacy Trust operates pharmacies in the following hospitals: Førde Central Hospital (Førde sentralsjukehus); Haugesund Hospital (Haugesund sjukehus); Haukeland University Hospital (Haukeland universitetetssjukehus); Stavanger University Hospital (Stavanger universitetssjukehus)
South-East Norway (Helse Sør-Øst RHF)	Akershus University Hospital Trust (Akershus universitetssykehus HF)	Akershus University Hospital (Akershus universitetssykehus); Kongsvinger Hospital (Kongsvinger sykehus); Ski Hospital (Ski sykehus)
South-East Norway (Helse Sør-Øst RHF)	Innlandet Hospital Trust (Sykehuset Innlandet HF)	Innlandet Hospital Elverum (Sykehuset Innlandet Elverum); Innlandet Hospital Gjøvik (Sykehuset Innlandet Gjøvik); Innlandet Hospital Hamar (Sykehuset Innlandet Hamar); Innlandet Hospital Lillehammer (Sykehuset Innlandet Lillehammer); Innlandet Hospital Tynset (Sykehuset Innlandet Tynset)
South-East Norway (Helse Sør-Øst RHF)	Oslo University Hospital Trust (Oslo universitetssykehus HF)	Oslo University Hospital, Aker (Oslo universitetssykehus, Aker); Oslo University Hospital, Radiumhospitalet (Oslo universitetssykehus, Radiumhospitalet); Oslo University Hospital, Rikshospitalet (Oslo universitetssykehus, Rikshospitalet); Oslo University Hospital, Ullevål (Oslo universitetssykehus, Ullevål)
South-East Norway (Helse Sør-Øst RHF)	Sunnaas Hospital Trust (Sunnaas sykehus HF)	Sunnaas Rehabilitation Hospital (Sunnaas sykehus)
South-East Norway (Helse Sør-Øst RHF)	Southern Norway Hospital Trust (Sørlandet sykehus HF)	Sørlandet Hospital Arendal (Sørlandet sykehus Arendal); Sørlandet Hospital Flekkefjord (Sørlandet sykehus Flekkefjord); Sørlandet Hospital Kristiansand (Sørlandet sykehus Kristiansand)
South-East Norway (Helse Sør-Øst RHF)	Telemark Hospital Trust (Sykehuset Telemark HF)	Skien Hospital (Sykehuset Telemark Skien); Porsgrunn Hospital (Sykehuset Telemark Porsgrunn); Kragerø Hospital (Sykehuset Telemark Kragerø); Notodden Hospital (Sjukehuset Telemark Notodden); Rjukan Hospital (Sykehuset Telemark Rjukan)
South-East Norway (Helse Sør-Øst RHF)	Vestfold Hospital Trust (Sykehuset i Vestfold HF)	Tønsberg Hospital (Tønsberg sykehus)
South-East Norway (Helse Sør-Øst RHF)	Vestre Viken Hospital Trust (Vestre Viken HF)	Bærum Hospital (Bærum sykehus); Drammen Hospital (Drammen sykehus); Hallingdal Hospital (Hallingdal sjukestugu); Kongsberg Hospital (Kongsberg sykehus); Ringerike Hospital (Ringerike sykehus)
South-East Norway (Helse Sør-Øst RHF)	Østfold Hospital Trust (Sykehuset Østfold HF)	Østfold Hospital Kalnes (Sykehuset Østfold Kalnes); Østfold Hospital Moss (Sykehuset Østfold Moss)
South-East Norway (Helse Sør-Øst RHF)	Hospital Pharmacies Trust (Sykehusapotekene HF)	The Pharmacy Trust operates pharmacies in the following hospitals: Akershus University Hospital (Akershus universitetssykehus); Sørlandet Hospital Arendal (Sørlandet sykehus Arendal); Bærum Hospital (Bærum sykehus); Drammen Hospital (Drammen sykehus); Innlandet Hospital Elverum (Sykehuset Innlandet Elverum); Innlandet Hospital Gjøvik (Sykehuset Innlandet Gjøvik); Innlandet Hospital Hamar (Sykehuset Innlandet Hamar); Østfold Hospital Kalnes (Sykehuset Østfold Kalnes); Kongsvinger Hospital (Kongsvinger sykehus); Sørlandet Hospital Kristiansand (Sørlandet sykehus Kristiansand); Innlandet Hospital Lillehammer (Sykehuset Innlandet Lillehammer); Østfold Hospital Moss (Sykehuset Østfold Moss); Oslo University Hospital, Aker (Oslo universitetssykehus, Aker); Oslo University Hospital, Radiumhospitalet (Oslo universitetssykehus, Radiumhospitalet); Oslo University Hospital, Rikshospitalet (Oslo universitetssykehus, Rikshospitalet); Oslo University Hospital, Ullevål (Oslo universitetssykehus, Ullevål); Skien Hospital (Sykehuset Telemark Skien); Tønsberg Hospital (Tønsberg sykehus)

== Private hospitals ==
- Skogli Health And Rehabilitation Center
- Privatsykehuset Haugesund
