= Bjørn Erikstein =

Norwegian physician and civil servant

Bjørn Kristoffer Erikstein (born 1952) is a Norwegian physician and civil servant, with prominent positions in the health sector.

He took his cand.med. and dr.med. degrees at the University of Oslo. From 1993, he was a specialist in oncology. He worked as a physician at Radiumhospitalet and Ullevål Hospital. He entered hospital administration as vice chief executive of the Southern Norway Regional Health Authority in 2003. In December 2004 he took over as chief executive. From 2003 he was also chair of Buskerud Hospital and Radiumhospitalet, later Rikshospitalet-Radiumhospitalet after a merger. This double role as executive and chair within the same structure was abolished in 2005.

When the Southern Norway Regional Health Authority was merged in 2007 with the Eastern Norway Regional Health Authority to form the Southern and Eastern Norway Regional Health Authority, he applied for the job as chief executive, but was narrowly edged out by Bente Mikkelsen. Erikstein was instead appointed as deputy under-secretary of state in the Ministry of Health and Care Services. In 2008–2009 he had a spell as acting chief executive of the Central Norway Regional Health Authority, before returning to the Ministry of Health. In 2011 Erikstein was appointed chief executive of Oslo University Hospital, following an interregnum after Siri Hatlen's resignation.

Civic offices
Preceded by Asbjørn Hofsli (acting)	Chief executive of the Southern Norway Regional Health Authority; 2004–2007	Succeeded by position abolished
Preceded by Jan Eirik Thoresen	Chief executive of the Central Norway Regional Health Authority (acting); 2008–2009	Succeeded by Gunnar Bovim
Preceded by Jan Eirik Thoresen (acting)	Chief executive of Oslo University Hospital; 2011–present	Incumbent
