= Regional health authority (Norway) =

State-owned enterprise responsible for specialist healthcare in Norway

A regional health authority (Norwegian: Regionalt helseforetak or RHF) is a state-owned enterprise responsible for specialist healthcare in one of four regions of Norway. Responsibilities of the RHFs include patient treatment, education of medical staff, research and training of patients and relatives. Areas covered by the authorities are hospitals, psychiatry, ambulance service, operation of pharmacies at the hospitals, emergency telephone number and laboratories. The actual performance is done by subsidiary health trusts (HF) that usually consist of one or more hospitals, with associate responsibilities. The authorities are subordinate to the Norwegian Ministry of Health and Care Services.

== Health reform ==
The authorities were created on January 1, 2002 when the Government of Norway took over the responsibilities of the hospitals from the counties. At the time there were created five authorities, but the Southern and Eastern Norway authorities were merged in 2007. The reform was credited to the Minister of Health, Tore Tønne (Labour) who only held office for one and a half years. The ultimate goal of the reform was to increase the effectiveness of the hospitals and reduce the cost of the specialist healthcare service, that in 2007 had an annual budget of NOK 114 billion, about 14% of the state budget.

=== Criticism ===
There has been some criticism of the health reform in Norway. Mr. Tønne was a corporate manager from Statoil and the Aker Group and the reform attempted to introduce corporate governance and to a certain degree public tender into the health care system of Norway. This has been criticised as being market fundamentalism, as the system was intended to take all decisions entirely on economic grounds. This was partially escalated by the initial decision to not have any politicians on the boards of the authorities and trusts, thus entirely removing control of the healthcare services from political bodies. Because all decisions were taken by the boards, and not by elected political bodies, entire hospitals could be closed without political resolution. The Second cabinet Stoltenberg has partially changed this policy by electing politicians onto the boards of the authorities.

Other criticism has been directed at the organisational form of the authorities. In essence the reform created more layers of administration (government - regional health authority - health trust - hospital), where there formerly only two (county and hospital). Also, the administrations of the authorities were places in towns outside the major regional centres, places that sometimes didn't even have a hospital, making recruitment of management difficult. This has partially been criticised as directors' wages have escalated to the level of corporate directors. The authorities have also, through cutbacks in government funding, accumulated large amounts of debt.

== Authorities and subsidiaries ==
- Central Norway Regional Health Authority
  - Central Norway Pharmaceutical Trust
  - Møre and Romsdal Hospital Trust
  - Nord-Trøndelag Hospital Trust
  - St. Olav's Hospital Trust
- Northern Norway Regional Health Authority
  - Finnmark Hospital Trust
  - Helgeland Hospital Trust
  - Hålogaland Hospital Trust
  - Nordland Hospital Trust
  - Northern Norway Pharmaceutical Trust
  - University Hospital of North Norway
- Southern and Eastern Norway Regional Health Authority
  - Aker University Hospital Trust
  - Blefjell Hospital Trust
  - Akershus University Hospital Trust
  - The New Akershus University Hospital Trust
  - Innlandet Hospital Trust
  - Psychiatry of Vestfold Trust
  - Rikshospitalet-Radiumhospitalet Trust
  - Southern and Eastern Norway Pharmaceutical Trust
  - Hospital of Southern Norway Trust
  - Sunnaas Hospital Trust
  - Sykehuspartner
  - Telemark Hospital Trust
  - Ullevål University Hospital Trust
  - Vestfold Hospital Trust
  - Vestre Viken Hospital Trust
  - Østfold Hospital Trust
- Western Norway Regional Health Authority
  - Bergen Health Trust
  - Fonna Health Trust
  - Førde Health Trust
  - Stavanger Health Trust
  - Western Norway Pharmaceutical Trust
