= Southern and Eastern Norway Pharmaceutical Trust =

Norwegian health trust

Sykehusapotekene HF
- Type: Health Trust
- Industry: Pharmacy
- Founded: 2002
- Headquarters: Oslo, Norway
- Area served: Southern and Eastern Norway
- Revenue: NOK 5.58 billion (2025)
- Number of employees: 820 (2017)
- Parent: Southern and Eastern Norway Regional Health Authority
- Website: sykehusapotekene.no

The Hospital Pharmacies Health Trust (Norwegian: Sykehusapotekene HF) is a health trust owned by Southern and Eastern Norway Regional Health Authority that operates nineteen hospital pharmacies. The pharmacies are part of the Ditt Apotek chain and use Norsk Medisinaldepot as wholesaler.

The pharmacies are located at Ullevål University Hospital, Rikshospitalet, Radiumhospitalet, Akershus University Hospital, Aker University Hospital, Asker og Bærum Hospital, Drammen Hospital, Tønsberg Hospital, Skien Hospital, Arendal Hospital, Arendal Hospital, Kristiansand Hospital, Fredrikstad Hospital, Sarpsborg Hospital, Moss Hospital, Kongsvinger Hospital, Elverum Hospital, Hamar Hospital, Gjøvik Hospital and Lillehammer Hospital.
