= Eastern Norway Regional Health Authority =

Norwegian regional health authority

Helse Øst RHF
- Industry: Healthcare
- Founded: January 1, 2002
- Defunct: June 1, 2007
- Fate: Merger
- Successor: Southern and Eastern Norway Regional Health Authority
- Headquarters: Hamar, Norway
- Parent: Norwegian Ministry of Health and Care Services

Eastern Norway Regional Health Authority (Norwegian: Helse Øst RHF) was a regional health authority that covered the counties of Akershus, Hedmark, Oppland, Oslo and Østfold. The authority was founded on January 1, 2002, but merged with the Southern Norway Regional Health Authority to form the new Southern and Eastern Norway Regional Health Authority on June 1, 2007.

The eight health trusts owned by the authority were Aker University Hospital, Akershus University Hospital, Asker and Bærum Hospital Trust, Østfold Hospital Trust, Innlandet Hospital Trust, Sunnaas Hospital, Ullevål University Hospital. It also owned part of Southern and Eastern Norway Pharmaceutical Trust.
