= Emergency medical services in Norway =

Emergency medical services in Norway are operated both by the government (financed through the four Service Delivery Regions, each with its own regional health authority) and private organizations such as the Norwegian People's Aid, the Norwegian Red Cross and commercial transportation companies. In most circumstances, emergency ambulance service is organized by a local Health Trust, and may be operated directly, or contracted to private providers, such as national transportation companies, for which ambulances are just a part of their business operations. Private organisations are also used frequently by the police in search & rescue operations.

== Organization ==
=== Land ambulance ===
Land ambulance service provision is funded by the national government, and provided by means of one of the four Regional Health Authorities (Southern and Eastern Norway Regional Health Authority, Southern Norway Regional Health Authority, Western Norway Regional Health Authority, and Northern Norway Regional Health Authority) which provide most healthcare in Norway. Services may be provided directly by the Trust or its member hospitals, but are typically outsourced. In many locations in Norway, the provision of land ambulance service is contracted to private operators, most typically large scale transportation companies operating a variety of types of service. Namsos Trafikkselskap (NTS) is an example of a private company participating in this type of arrangement for service delivery. While the majority of such arrangements are currently with Norwegian-based companies, this is changing, and international companies, such as Falck are beginning to contract for services in some areas. Such services may operate 24 hours per day in larger centers, but in remote and rural locations are still frequently staffed by 'on-call' personnel after normal business hours. Even in areas with directly operated emergency ambulances, non-emergency transportation is more likely to be conducted by commercial transportation companies. Norway currently operates on the Franco-German model of EMS care, with some limitations on the permitted skills of EMS personnel, and physician response to emergencies being quite commonplace.

EMS Vehicles in Norway

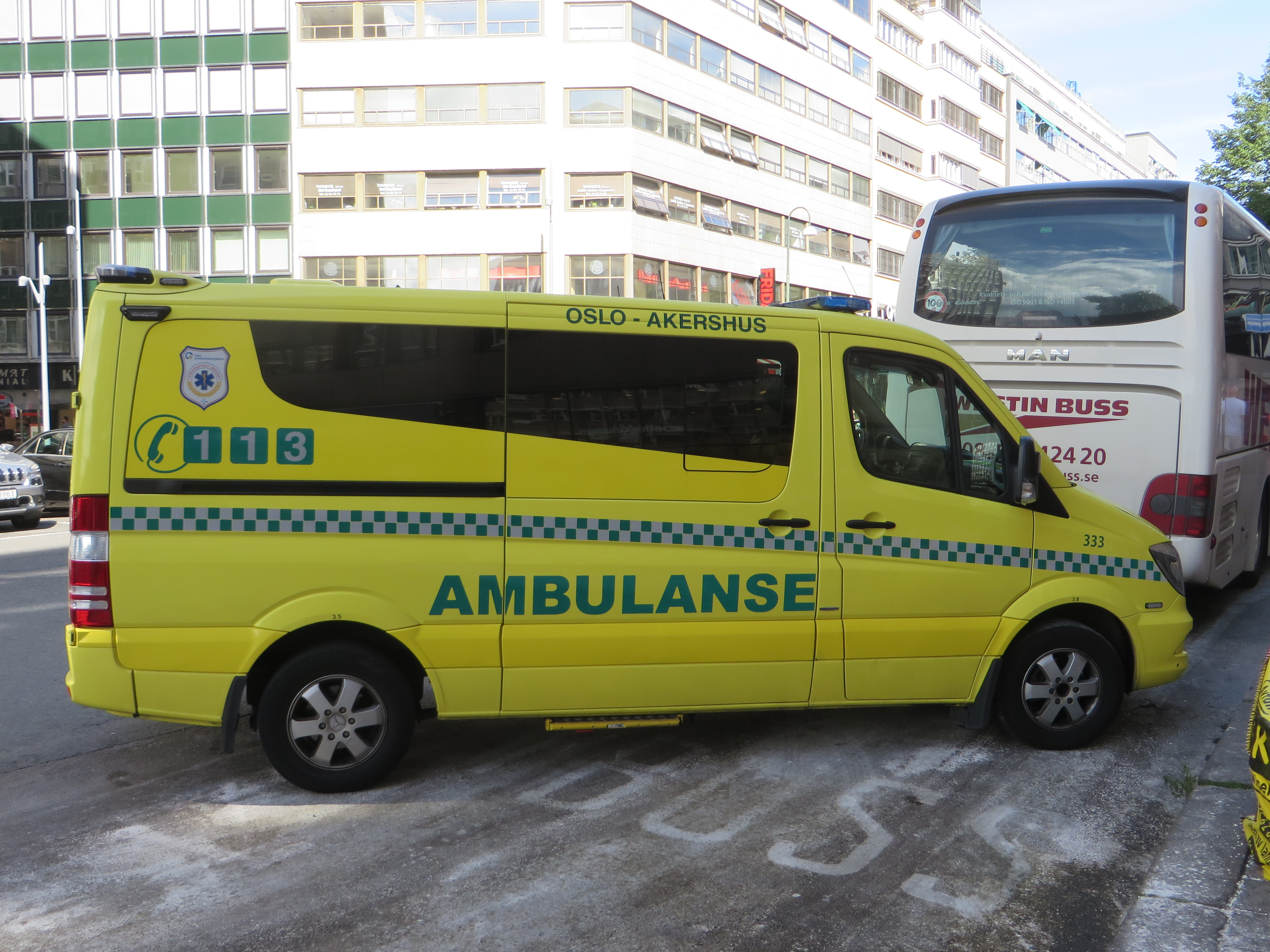
Mercedes-Benz Sprinter ambulance in service for Oslo and Akershus. The Sprinter is the most common type of ambulance in Norway.

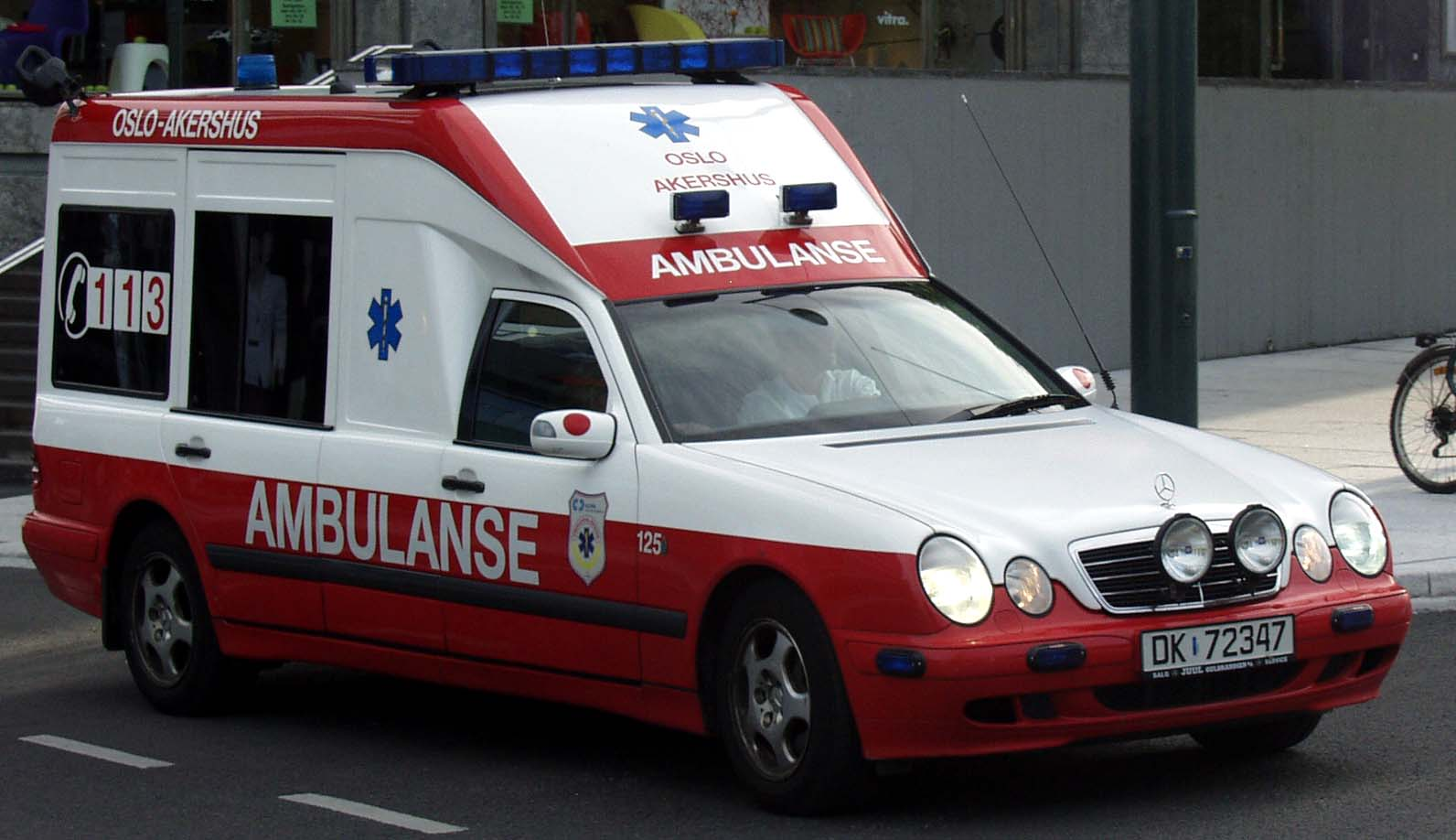
A former ambulance in the color scheme that existed until 2005

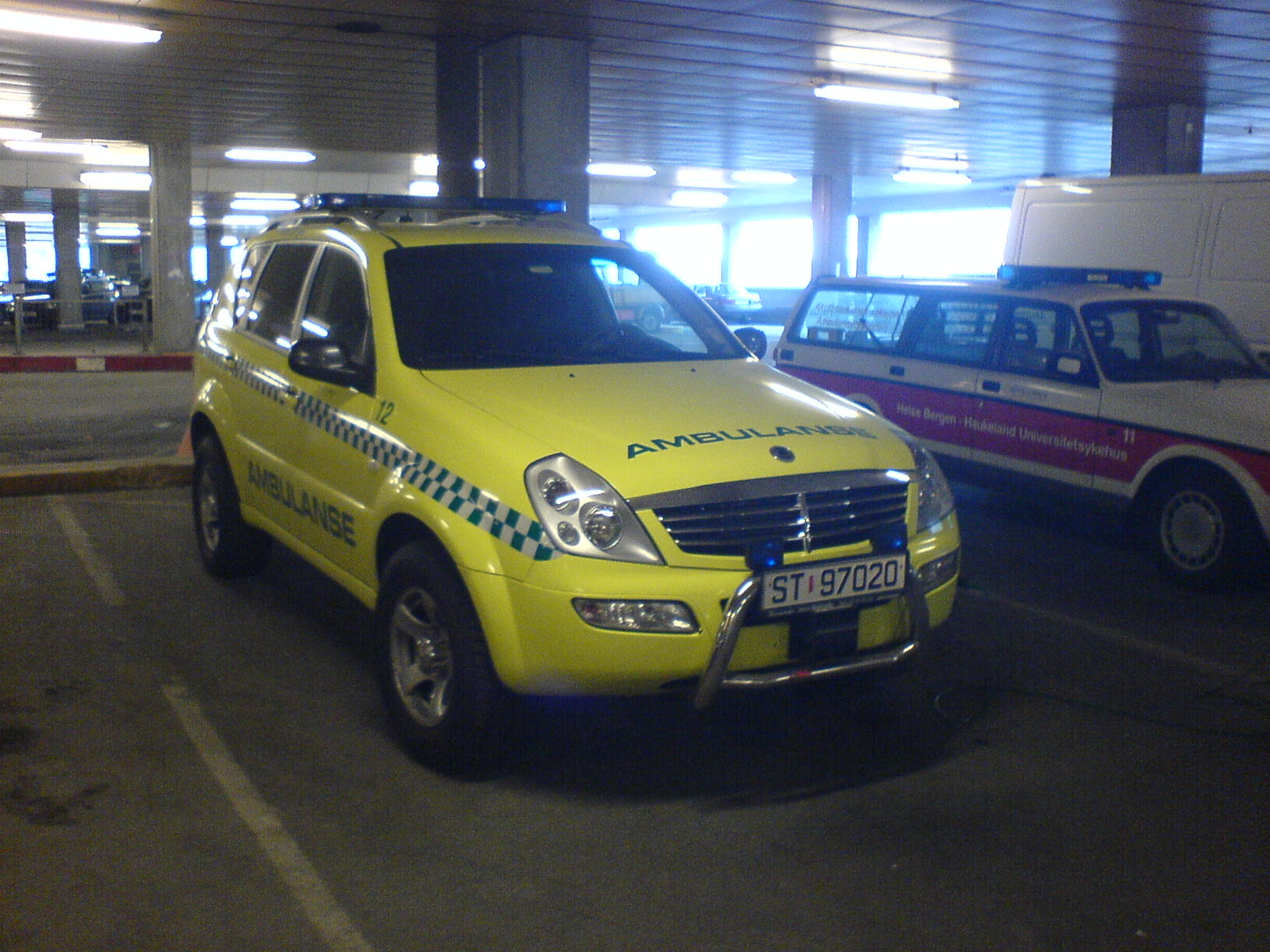
SsangYong Rexton Rapid Response (ALS) Vehicle in service for Oslo and Akershus

=== Air ambulance ===
As Norway has a very scattered population with many small towns and villages that are located far from hospitals and treatment centers, land ambulances are supplemented by both helicopters and fixed wing aircraft. These are organized nationally, under the title Norwegian Air Ambulance. Participants in the air ambulance scheme include the Royal Norwegian Air Force 330 Squadron, and also one privately owned company (Lufttransport) and one not-for-profit foundation (Norsk Luftambulanse). The relationship with the private company and the foundation are contractual, and currently extend to 2014.

Air ambulance in Norway

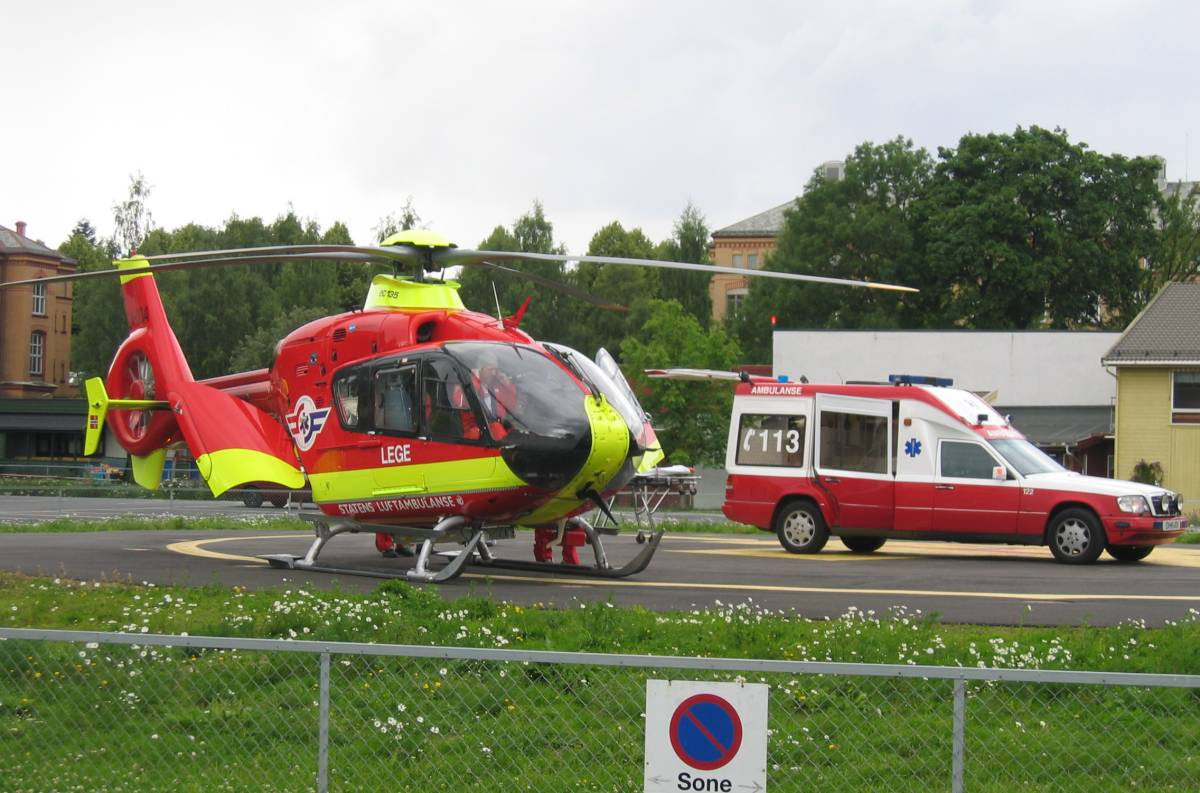
Statens Luftambulanse (former name), operated by Norsk Luftambulanse, in old scheme

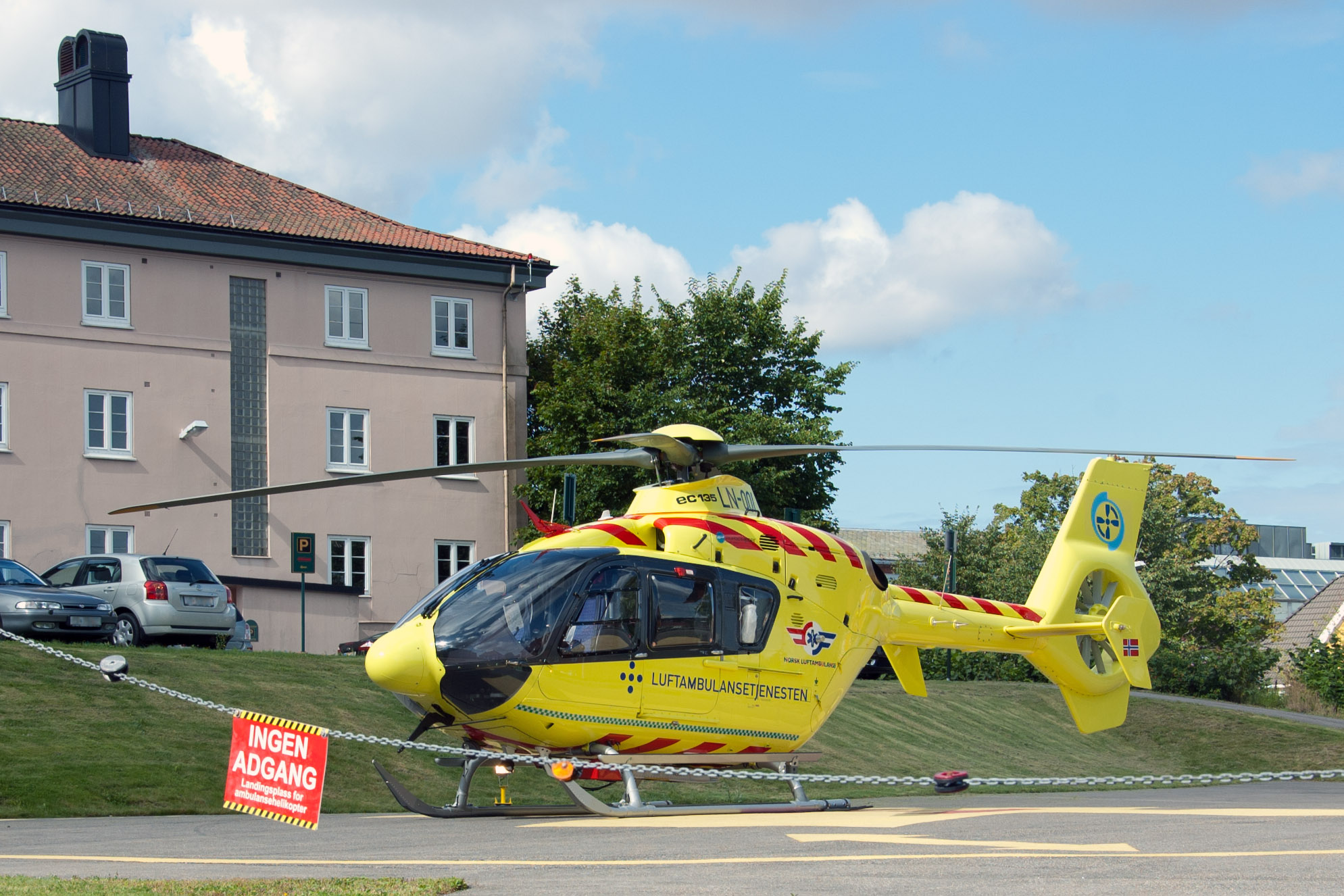
Luftambulansetjenesten, operated by Norsk Luftambulanse, in new scheme

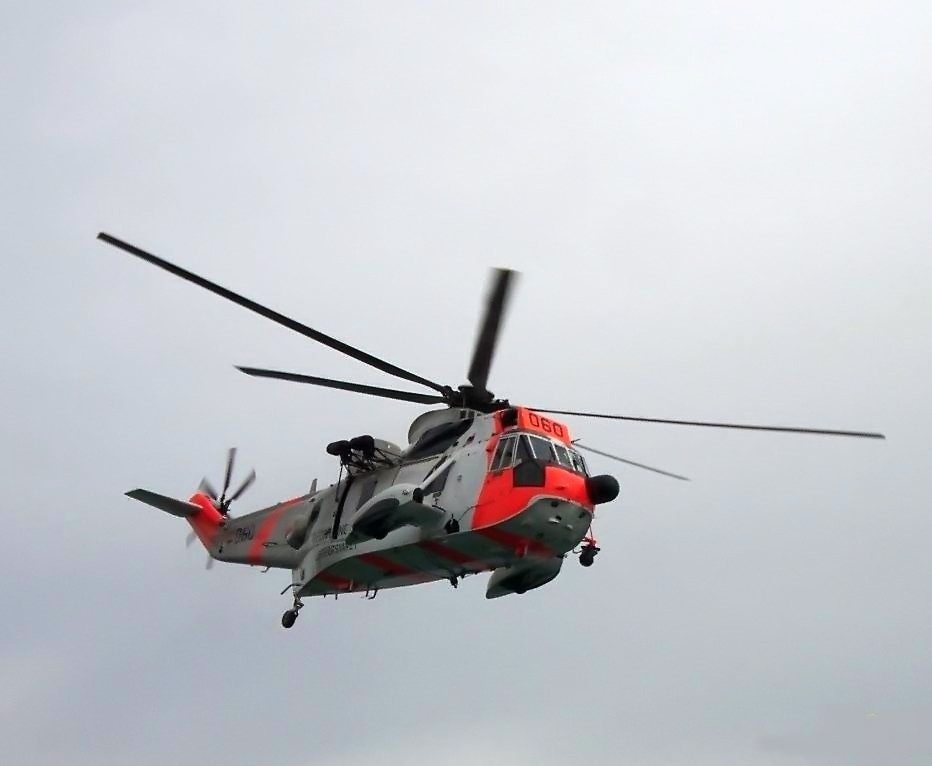
A Westland Sea King helicopter operated by the 330 Squadron

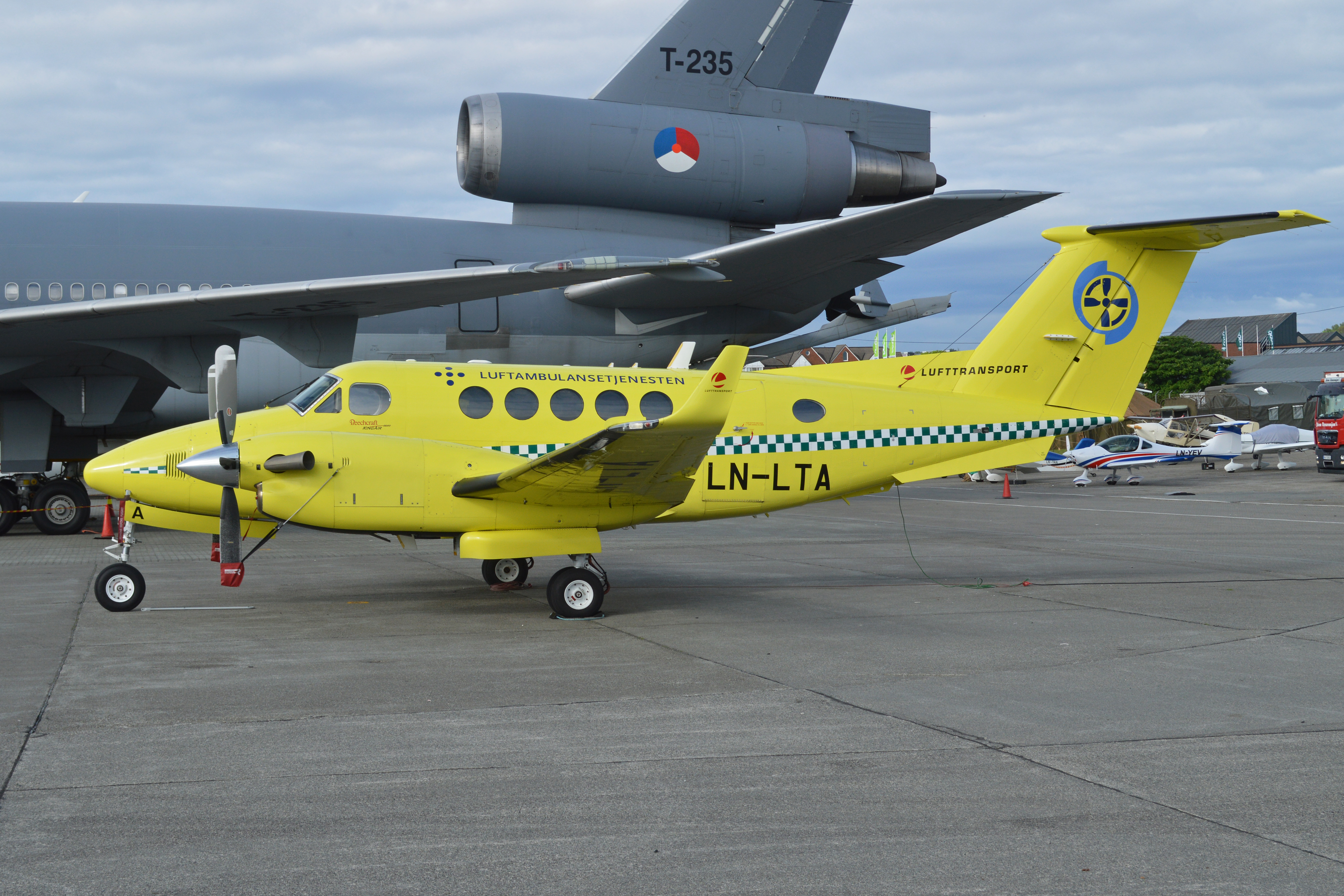
Air ambulance operated by Lufttransport

=== Marine ambulance ===
Norway's very nature and the fact that many communities are better accessed by water than by land have resulted in the use of dedicated, high speed water ambulances. Such services may be provided directly, or may be contracted out to a larger marine transportation company. Water ambulances may be found in Oslo and Stavanger, among other locations.

== Standards ==
=== Staffing ===
Ambulances are usually staffed by two emergency medical technicians. Ambulances in Norway have traditionally carried EMTs with only 2 or 3 month courses in acute emergency medicine, however, an increasing focus on the importance of prehospital medicine has resulted in such courses being phased out, in favor of a far more comprehensive 2+2 year education process. At a national level, effort is being made to reduce the number of ambulances staffed by personnel on home call, but this arrangement still occurs fairly frequently in rural areas.

=== Training ===
EMTs newly entering the field are now recommended to have two years of training at Vocational school followed by two-year internships. This program has been offered since 2003, and is inspired by American EMS training. The system currently has individuals working at the Basic, Intermediate and Advanced levels, and for vehicles providing ALS service, the crew configuration is typically 1-ILS, 1-ALS. Those EMTs already working in the field, and with sufficient experience, are permitted to 'fast track' the new training, completing a degree with the equivalent of a single year of full-time education. Only those EMTs completing this education process are permitted to use the title "Paramedic". While the program is not yet mandatory on a national level, it is considered to be a prerequisite for employment in the Oslo region. Norway has also come up with the proposal to add qualified nurses on the ambulances, as other countries in Europe have done within its system.

=== Vehicles ===
Norwegian ambulances are required to comply with the European Union standard CEN 1789 (types A-C) for ambulances, as issued by the European Committee for Standards. These standards include the types of vehicles used, their design, performance, testing, basic equipment, and markings or livery. As with all European Standards, compliance is voluntary, but has been mandated by the Norwegian government.

=== Response time ===
The national goal is that any citizen should not have to wait more than 12 minutes (in urban areas) or 20 minutes (in sparsely populated areas) for emergency services. This goal is not yet being achieved consistently.
