= Healthcare in Norway =

In Norway, municipalities are in charge of providing basic healthcare, while specialised healthcare is provided by the state through public hospitals.

As the money given to municipalities is not set aside for any particular purpose, each municipality is free to determine its own health budget. Municipalities coordinate primary healthcare services through agreements with independent physicians. In Norway, private healthcare providers are not compensated unless they have a contract with the public health service.

All public hospitals in Norway are run as health trusts (helseforetak (HF)) incorporated into one of four regional health authorities (regionale helseforetak (RHF)) overseen by the Ministry of Health and Care Services. In addition to these public hospitals, there are a small number of privately owned health clinics currently operating.

== Statistics ==
With a population of 5 391 369 as of the first quarter of 2021, and a gross national income per capita of 70 800 (PPP, current international dollar) in 2019, Norway has a life expectancy at birth of 84 years for women and 81 years for men as of 2016. As of 2019, there are 2.5 deaths for children under 5 years of age per 1000 live births.

Probability of dying between 15 and 60 years m/f (per 1,000 population, 2016)	66/42
Total expenditure on health per capita (Intl $, 2014)	6,347
Total expenditure on health as a percentage of GDP (2017)	10.4
Latest data available from the Global Health Observatory and SSB, NO Statistical agency

== Availability and cost ==
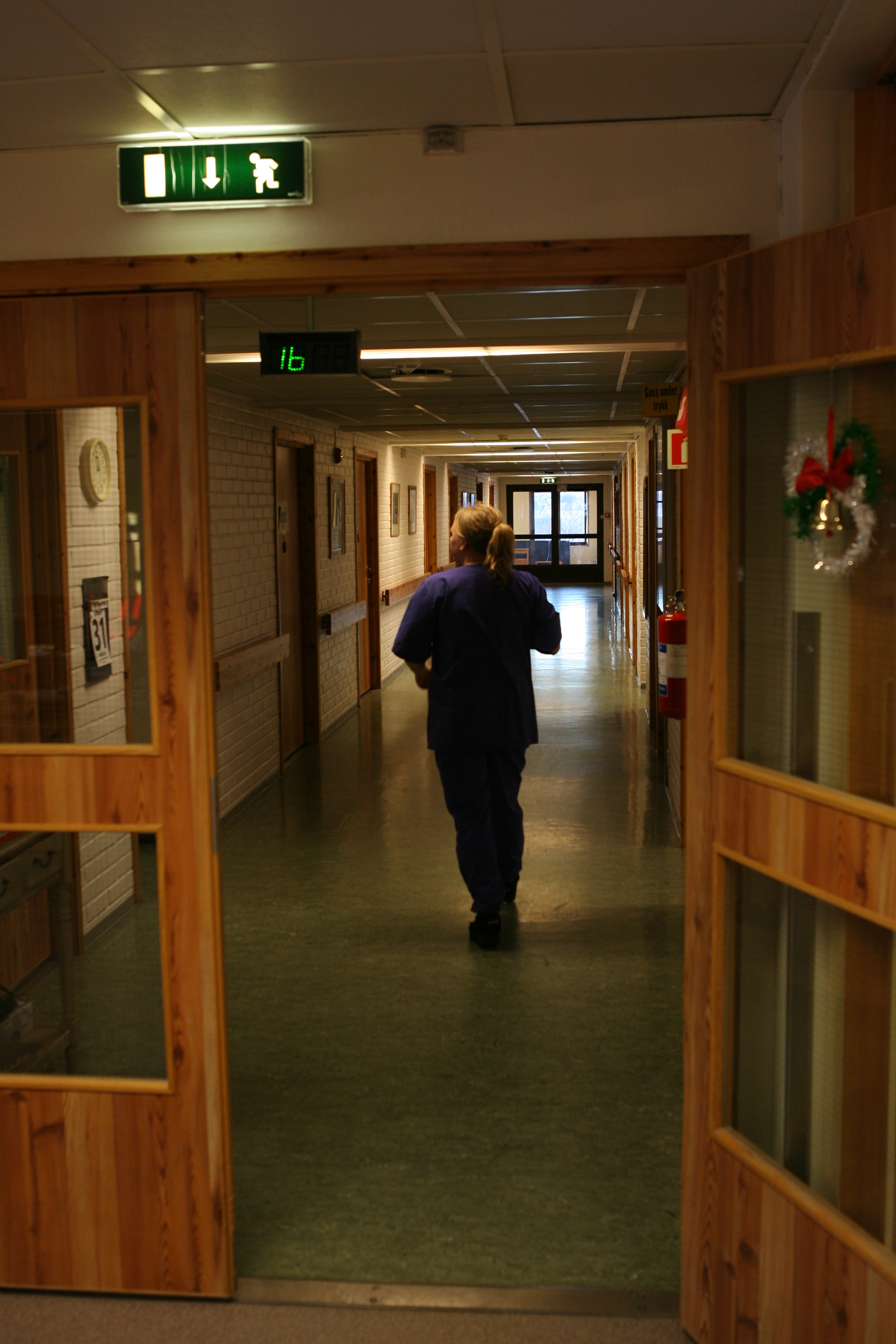
A nurse at a nursing home in Nord-Trøndelag, Norway

Expenditure on healthcare is about 7,727 USD per person per year in 2020, among the highest in the world. It has the highest proportion of nurses and midwives per person in Europe: 1,744 per 100,000 people in 2015.

While the availability of public healthcare is universal in Norway, there are certain payment stipulations. Children aged sixteen or younger, and several other groups (such as nursing women and retirees) are given free healthcare regardless of the coverage they may have had in previous situations. All other citizens are responsible for paying a certain amount in user fees. If they reach a certain amount of money paid out-of-pocket, they receive an exemption card (frikort for helsetjenester in Norwegian) for public health services, and they no longer have to pay user fees for the remainder of the calendar year. The amount is 2,460 NOK in 2021, or about US$264. Everything above this amount is given for free for the rest of that year.

The exemption card covers family doctors, psychologists, outpatient clinics, radiology services, laboratory tests, patient travel, medicines and equipment falling under the "blue prescription" system, physiotherapy, dental diseases and abnormalities, periodontitis, rehabilitation, and travel for treatment abroad arranged by the National Hospital (Rikshospitalet). Dentists and dental hygienists are not included, but hospitalisation and everything related to being hospitalised in Norway is free for any citizen regardless of income or deductible status. In terms of emergency room admission, all immediate healthcare costs are covered.

== Health expenses and governmental funding ==
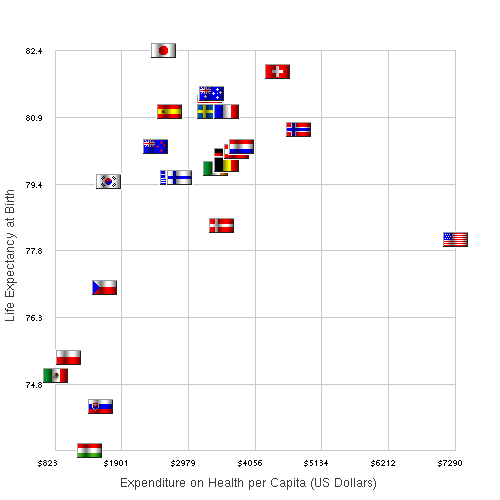
Life expectancy vs healthcare spending for some countries in 2007

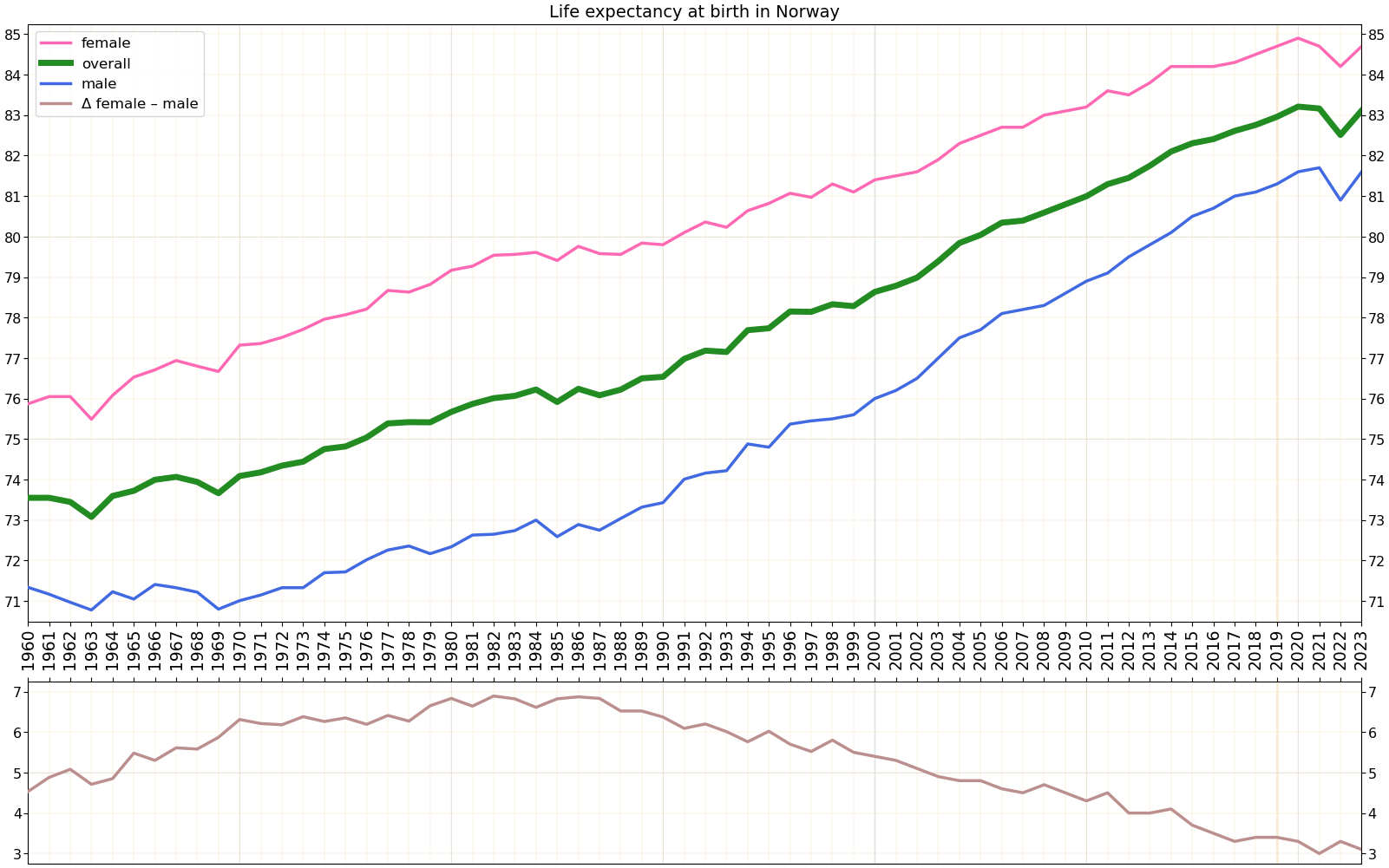
Life expectancy development in Norway by gender

Norway scores overall very high on different rankings in health care performances worldwide. Unique for the Norwegian health care system is that the state funds almost all expenses a patient would have. Patients with extra high expenses due to a permanent illness receive a tax deduction.

In 2020, 11.3% of the country's GDP went to health spending, and only about 14% of that was private spending (out-of-pocket payments), reflecting moderate cost-sharing requirements. The public share of health spending as a proportion of total government expenditure is only around 17%.

The government creates an annual health budget for the following year, every year in December. This budget includes all expenses within the health branch of Norway. The parliament has only on some occasions voted for additional funds later in the year, primarily for hospitals. The welfare state costs a lot to maintain and to improve after the standard and inflation of the year.

Pension, regulated after age, is the largest expense in the budget section covering health and welfare. The government has changed in the year of 2018 the management of expenses and funding to the health sector, with the goal to shorten the length of waiting lines and improve health services.

Funds for hospital care are allocated to the regional health authorities after the budget is passed for the coming year. They are responsible to distribute the financial funding to hospitals and other health services locally.

== History and development ==
After the Second World War the government of Norway decided to include national health care as one of their main focuses in the development of the welfare state. The state is responsible for providing good and necessary health services for everyone. This responsibility is divided between three levels of government: the state, county, and municipality.

The government is responsible for developing laws and passing bills, but the Department of Health and Care has the main responsibility for the daily running and operations of health politics and health services in Norway. In 2001 every citizen gained the right to have a permanent doctor in the area they live in. The city council in every county is responsible for this right, and they also initiate agreements and cooperation with the doctors.

This improvement is one of several in healthcare that Norway has to offer. The various reforms share the common thread that they all came as a reaction to inefficient systems that did not take full advantage of all available resources. Another major reform that came in the beginning of the 21st century, was the health reform of 2002.

== Hospital reform of 2002 ==
In 2002, the government took over the responsibility of running the hospitals in the country. Kjell Magne Bondevik was the prime minister at the time. He was the leader of the Christian Democratic Party and was head of the coalition government (alongside the Conservatives and Liberals). Up until then, hospitals in Norway were operated by the counties and city councils. The goal of the reforms was to improve the quality of medical treatment, to run the hospitals more efficiently than previously and to make medical treatment equally available to everyone in the country.

The reform was inspired by the New Public Management movement, and major changes were realized in accordance with these principles. Hospitals and services were organised as health trusts into five regional health authorities. These are independent legal entities organised and operated like corporations, with a few differences: the health trusts and authorities are only owned by the government, they cannot go bankrupt and are guaranteed by the government. The government also give loans and gives them financing from state funding.

The reform was to some extent successful. Patient waiting lists before treatment were reduced with almost 20 thousand patients. However, the spending on healthcare in Norway increased, and after a year the financial deficit reached almost 3.1 billion. Also, efficiency improvements in treatments have impacted patient experience as they have less time with the doctor and sometimes must check out of the hospital on the same day as they were admitted.

== Pharmaceuticals ==
Norway does not produce the bulk of pharmaceuticals consumed domestically, and imports the majority that are used in its health system. This has resulted in most residents having to pay full price for any prescription. Pharmaceutical exporting is overseen by the Ministry of Health and Care Services. Insurance coverage for medicine imported from outside the country is managed through the Norwegian Health Economics Administration (HELFO).

== Administration ==
Norway has four designated Regional Health Authorities. They are: Northern Norway Regional Health Authority, Central Norway Regional Health Authority, Western Norway Regional Health Authority, and Southern and Eastern Norway Regional Health Authority. According to the Patients' Rights Act, all eligible persons have the right to a choice in hospitals when receiving treatment.

== Performance ==
The Norwegian Health Care System was ranked number 11 in overall performance by the World Health Organization in a 2000 report evaluating the health care systems of each of the 191 United Nations member nations. According to the Euro health consumer index, in 2015 the Norwegian health system was ranked third in Europe but had inexplicably long waiting lists as 270,000 Norwegians were waiting for medical treatment in 2012–13. In the OECD publication Health at a Glance 2011, Norway had among the longest wait times for elective surgery and specialist appointments among eleven countries surveyed. However, the Norwegian government has been successful in reducing the average wait times for hospital care in recent years.

== Pregnancy and maternity care ==
All pregnant women in Norway are entitled to maternity care from a midwife at a Maternity and Child Health Care Centre or from their General Practitioner.

There are usually eight antenatal appointments including one ultrasound screening during pregnancy. The consultations are free of charge, and pregnant employees have the right to paid time off work for antenatal appointments.

There were 56,600 children born in 2017, 2,300 fewer than the previous year. This gave a total fertility rate of 1.62 children per woman - the lowest measured in Norway ever.

139 children were registered as stillborn in 2017. This corresponds to 2.4 deaths per 1,000 born and is the lowest number ever recorded.

Mortality rate, under 5- and under 1-age.
Observed deaths per 1000 live	1990	2016
Under 5 years	8.6	2.7
Under 1 year	7.0	2.2

In Norway 2015: Nursing and midwifery personnel density (per 1000 population).Value: 17.824. That includes practising midwives and practising nurses. Data Source: OECD Health Data, accessed October 2017. WHO region: Europe Effective. date: 2018-02-26

== Infectious diseases ==
Global incidence of many infectious diseases has declined. Higher standards of living and improved hygienic conditions are a major cause, as well as the prevalence of vaccines. Nonetheless, increased international travel and import of food is causing an increase in some infectious diseases in Norway such as some foodborne infections and infections by antibiotic-resistant bacteria. Patients are exempt from cost-sharing for visits, tests, and treatments for all infectious diseases deemed to pose a threat to public health.

=== Tuberculosis ===
Tuberculosis is the most infectious disease worldwide, and is a major challenge in global health care. However, in Norway, the decline in the number of tuberculosis cases continues.

By 2017, a total of 261 patients with tuberculosis were reported to the Institute of Public Health. This is a decline from previous years. During the last twenty years, the highest number of patients with tuberculosis was 392 in 2013. It makes Norway one of the countries with the lowest tuberculosis incidence in the world. Differences in the global disease burden of tuberculosis are also reflected in the disparities of infection rates within Norway, where major inequalities based on people's country of origin can be observed. Only 11 percent of the patients who were reported with tuberculosis disease in 2017 were born in Norway, and only half of them had Norwegian-born parents.

=== MDR-TB ===
The number of multiresistant tuberculosis cases is between four and 11 cases per year. By 2017, nine patients were diagnosed with multiresistant tuberculosis. None of these had developed resistance during treatment in Norway.

=== Preventive treatment, latent tuberculosis ===
Most cases of tuberculosis disease in Norway are detected early and therefore are not transmitted, i.e. they are considered latent.

An important part of the tuberculosis work in Norway is ensuring that people with an increased risk of post-infection disease development are offered preventative treatment. In addition to those who are thought to be newly infected, high risk groups include children and persons with impaired immune system.

The number of people receiving preventative treatment is still too low, according to the Institute of Public Health. The number of preventative treatments is expected to be greater than the number treated for tuberculosis disease, but in several counties these groups are about the same.

=== HIV/AIDS ===
HIV infection is present in all countries of the world. UNAIDS estimates that by the end of 2016 approximately 36.7 million people living with HIV infection, approximately 17 million of these have access to antiviral treatment. Since the start of the HIV epidemic, it is estimated that approx. 78 million people have been infected with HIV and approximately 35 million people have died of AIDS-related illnesses. Globally, women account for 52% of the HIV-infected persons. About 69% of the HIV-infected live in sub-Saharan Africa. In 2016, around 1.8 million individuals acquired HIV. This is the lowest number of newly diagnosed since the mid-1990s.

In Norway, HIV infection and AIDS have also been present and since 1983 the Institute of Public Health in Oslo has been observing and performing statistical analysis, showing overall low incidence. In 2017, there were 18 individuals diagnosed with AIDS and 213 individuals diagnosed with HIV.

People who test HIV positive are referred to a doctor with a good knowledge of HIV. Treatment for HIV infection is usually handled by a specialist health service in the hospital. For people who live far from a hospital, the local doctor can collaborate with the specialists to give the best possible local support.

== United Nations: Sustainable development goals, SDGs 2016-2030 ==
Norway regards the 2030 Agenda with its 17 Sustainable Development Goals (SDGs) as a transformative global roadmap for both national and international efforts aimed at eradicating extreme poverty, while protecting planetary boundaries and promoting prosperity, peace and justice.

Norway was also a part of the 2016 voluntary national review of the high level political forum on Sustainable development.

UN reports and various international indexes show that Norway ranks high in terms of global implementation of the SDGs. At the same time, it is evident that implementing the 2030 Agenda will be demanding for Norway, too.

The Government has identified a number of targets that pose particular challenges for domestic follow-up in Norway. These challenges relate to several of the SDGs and all three dimensions of sustainable development – social, economic, and environmental. Targets that are likely to remain the focus of political attention and policy development are those relating to sustainable consumption and production, health and education, equality, employment, and migration. The Government is giving priority to ensuring quality education and employment, especially for young people and those at risk of marginalisation. This is an important contribution to realising the 2030 Agenda vision of leaving no one behind. Challenges that have been identified at the national level:

- Reducing non-communicable diseases and promoting mental health
- Increasing high-school completion rates
- Eliminating all forms of violence against women and girls
- Reducing the proportion of young people not in employment, education or training
- Ensuring sustainable infrastructure
- Sustaining income growth of the bottom 40% of the population at a rate higher than the national average
- Improving urban air quality
- Halving food waste and reducing waste generation
- Reducing the impact of invasive alien species
- Reducing all forms of violence and related death rates and combating organised crime.

== See also ==
- Health in Norway
