= Solveig Vatnar =

Norwegian psychologist

- Born: 1968 (age 57–58)
- Education: University of Oslo
- Awards: Rights Prize
- Scientific career
- Fields: Psychology
- Workplaces: Oslo University Hospital
- Thesis: An Interactional Perspective on Help-Seeking Women Subject to intimate Partner Violence (2009)

Solveig Karin Bø Vatnar (born 1968) is a Norwegian psychologist and violence researcher. She is a principal scientist and professor at Oslo University Hospital's center for security, prison and forensic psychiatry, and researches homicide perpetrated by intimate partners and family members. She has been a member of several royal commissions, i.e. government-appointed expert commissions.

== Education and career ==
Vatnar earned the cand.psychol. degree (1995), is a licensed clinical psychologist and specialist in clinical psychology, and holds a PhD in psychology from the University of Oslo. Her doctoral dissertation was titled An Interactional Perspective on Help-Seeking Women Subject to intimate Partner Violence.

Vatnar has been a member of several government-appointed expert commissions. In 2001 she was appointed by the King-in-Council as a member of the Royal Commission on Violence against Women that presented Norwegian Official Report NOU 2003: 31: Retten til et liv uten vold – Menns vold mot kvinner i nære relasjoner in 2003. She was a member of the Royal Commission on Gun Control, appointed by the King-in-Council in 2010. In 2018 she was appointed by the King-in-Council as a member of the Royal Commission on Intimate Partner Homicide.

== Research ==
Vatnar has particularly researched homicide perpetrated by intimate partners or other family members, and has been the lead researcher of several national studies on intimate partner homicides. Commissioned by the Ministry of Justice and Public Security, she carried out a survey of all intimate partner homicides in Norway from 1990 to 2012.

== Recognition ==
Vatnar received the Rights Prize (Rettighetsprisen) in 2022.
