= Southern Norway Regional Health Authority =

Norwegian regional health authority

Helse Sør RHF
- Industry: Healthcare
- Founded: January 1, 2002
- Defunct: June 1, 2007
- Fate: Merger
- Successor: Southern and Eastern Norway Regional Health Authority
- Headquarters: Skien, Norway
- Parent: Norwegian Ministry of Health and Care Services

Southern Norway Regional Health Authority (Norwegian: Helse Sør RHF) was a regional health authority that covered the counties of Aust-Agder, Buskerud, Telemark, Vest-Agder and Vestfold in Norway, as well as the national hospitals in Oslo. The authority was founded on January 1, 2002, but merged with the Eastern Norway Regional Health Authority to form the new Southern and Eastern Norway Regional Health Authority on June 1, 2007.

The eight health trusts owned by the authority were Blefjell Health Trust, Rikshospitalet–Radiumhospitalet, Vestfold Psychiatric Health Trust, Ringerike Heath Trust, Buskerud Health Trust, Vestfold Health Trust, Telemark Health Trust and Sørlandet Health Trust. It also owned by of Southern and Eastern Norway Pharmaceutical Trust.
