= Are Helseth =

Norwegian politician

Are helseth
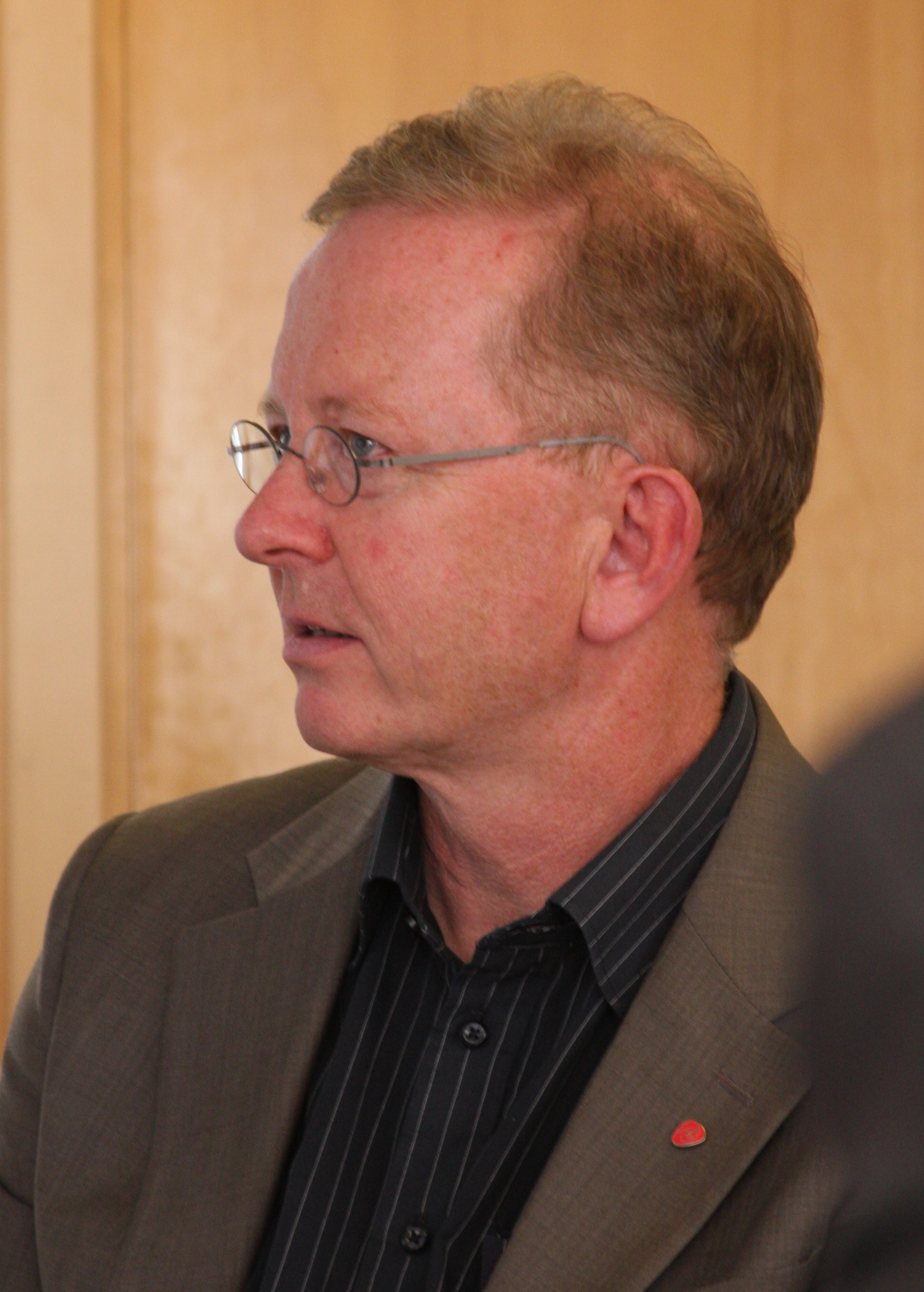

Member of Parliament for Akershus
- In office 14 September 2009 – 16 October 2013

Personal details
- Born: 11 January 1955 (age 71) Oslo
- Party: Labour party
- Occupation: Politician
- Profession: surgeon

Are Helseth (born 11 January 1955) is a Norwegian physician, health administrator and politician for the Labour Party.

== Early life ==
He was born in Oslo to director Per A. Helseth (1924–2003) and Line Arnlaug (1932–1991), but moved to West Bærum as a child. Helseth attended Gjettum junior high school from 1968 to 1971 and Valler Upper Secondary School from 1971 to 1974. He then enrolled in medical school at the University of Oslo, graduating as a medical doctor in 1981.

== Career ==
He worked as a surgeon at Bærum Hospital while simultaneously running a private practice called Helset Medical Centre. The centre is named after the location Helset in Bærum.

He had the rank of chief physician at Bærum Hospital from 1997 to 2000, then became director of health and social services in Akershus County Municipality. In 2001 he went on to become vice chief executive of the Southern and Eastern Norway Regional Health Authority, whereas from 2003 to 2005 he was the chief executive of Akershus University Hospital. He returned to the Southern and Eastern Norway Regional Health Authority as a strategy adviser, then was a project director in the Ministry of Health and Care Services in 2006 and chief executive of Fürst Medisinsk Laboratorium from 2007.

Helseth became active in local politics as campaign leader for the Labour Party in Bærum for the 2005 Norwegian parliamentary election. He became a local board member in 2006, and served as a deputy representative to the Parliament of Norway from Akershus during the terms 2009–2013 and 2013–2017. He became a full member of Parliament in 2009, covering for Anniken Huitfeldt who was a member of Stoltenberg's Second Cabinet. He remained such until Stoltenberg's Second Cabinet lost office in October 2013.

Civic offices
Preceded by Øystein Dolva	Director of Akershus University Hospital; 2003-2005	Succeeded by Erik Kreyberg Normann
