= Siri Hatlen =

Norwegian businessperson (born 1957)

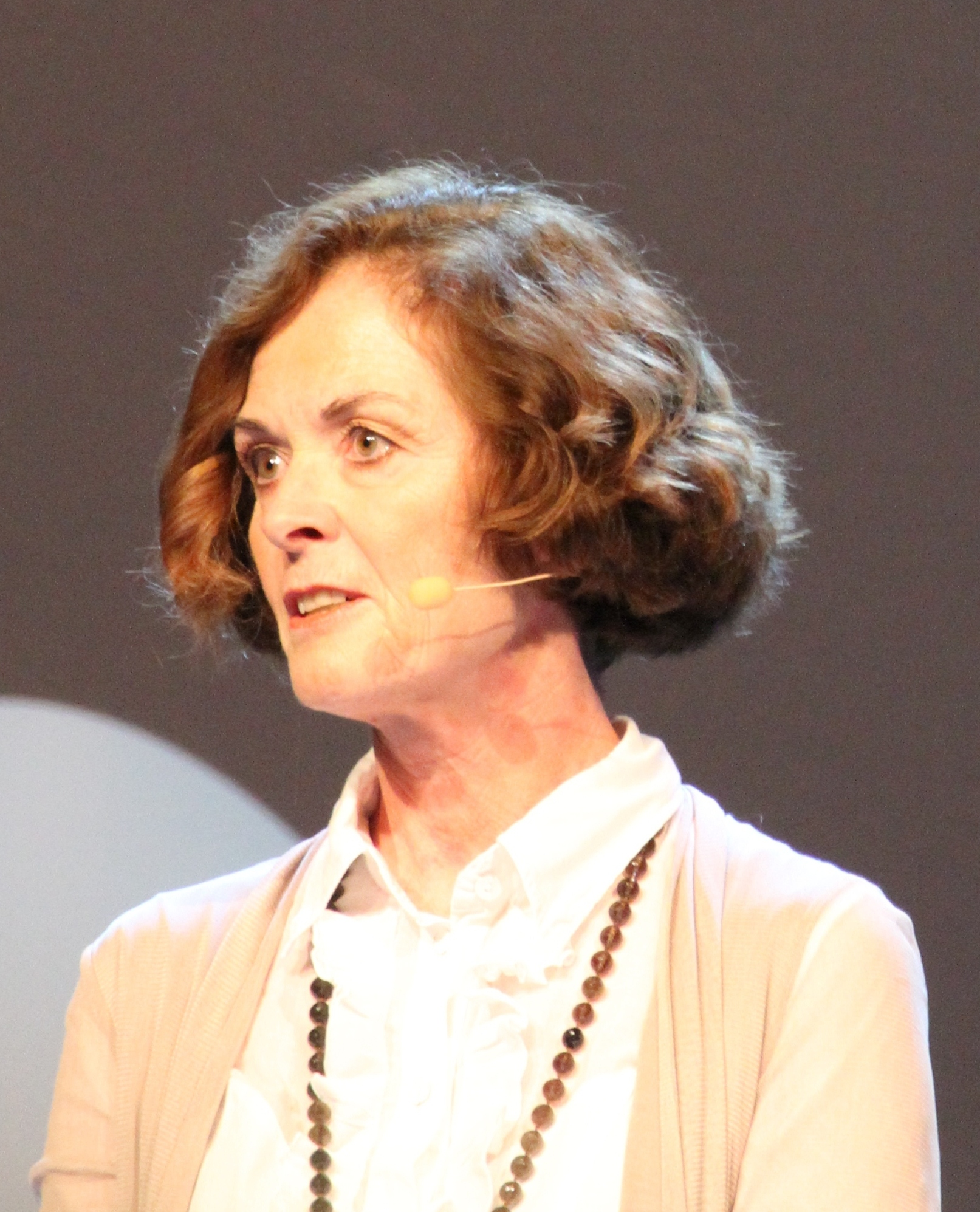
- Born: May 5, 1957 (age 69); Bærum, Norway
- Education: Norwegian Institute of Technology, INSEAD
- Title: CEO of Oslo University Hospital (2009-2011)
- Successor: Bjørn Erikstein
- Spouse: Birger Magnus (m. 1980)
- Children: 4

Siri Beate Hatlen (born 5 May 1957) is a Norwegian businessperson. A "Sivilingeniør" by education with several years in the petroleum industry, since 1996 she has been an independent consultant. After succeeding in turning operations in various companies in the late 1990s, she has become best known as a health executive. She was the chair of the Eastern Norway Regional Health Authority during its entire existence from 2001 to 2006, later chief executive officer of Oslo University Hospital from 2009 to 2011.

== Career ==
Hatlen holds a "Sivilingeniør" degree in chemistry from the Norwegian Institute of Technology in 1980 and a Master of Business Administration from INSEAD in 1991. While studying chemistry she chaired the Conservative Students' Association in Trondheim and was a board member of the Student Society in Trondheim and the publishing house Tapir. In her early career she worked in the petroleum for Elf Aquitaine and Statoil. Among others, she was responsible for the completion of the oil platform Gullfaks C.

In 1996 she left Statoil, and became independent with a connection to the consulting firm Kjeld Rimberg & Co. During this period, she was hired as chief executive of Universitetsforlaget from 1996 to 1997 and the Henie-Onstad Art Centre from 1998 to 1999, with a specialty in turning downward facing economic trends in the institutions. She was also an adviser in the Norwegian Museum of Contemporary Art. She was later a full-time chair of the Eastern Norway Regional Health Authority from 2001 to 2006. This was then merged to form the South Eastern Norway Regional Health Authority. Hatlen was asked to become chair here, but rejected the offer.

She has also been chair of Vinmonopolet, Det Norske Samlaget, Undervisningsbygg and the Norwegian State Educational Loan Fund, and a board member of Petroleum Geo-Services, Helsebygg Midt-Norge, Interconsult, Blom, the Norwegian University of Science and Technology, Kongsberg Gruppen, Smedvig, Hands, the Norwegian Glacier Museum, Det Norske Teatret, and Oslo Lufthavn.

In 2007 she was hired as corporate director in Statkraft. In 2009 she went on to be chief executive officer of Oslo University Hospital, Scandinavia's largest hospital with 22,000 employees. Later that year she backed down as chair of Vinmonopolet and Det Norske Samlaget. She resigned in 2011 following disagreements with the board of directors (headed by Göran Stiernstedt) over long-term planning.

Hatlen continued her business career as chair of Sevan Marine from 2011 and Entra Eiendom from 2012, and President of the Organizing Committee for the 2016 Winter Youth Olympics in Lillehammer as well as board member of Export Credit Norway.

== Personal life ==
She hails from Bærum and still resides there. She is married to Birger Magnus, whom she met during her studies in Trondheim, and has four children.

Business positions
Preceded by position created	Chair of the Eastern Norway Regional Health Authority; 2001–2006	Succeeded by position abolished
Preceded by Harald Arnkværn	Chair of Vinmonopolet; 2005–2009	Succeeded by Hill-Marta Solberg
Preceded by Erik Omland (acting)	Chief executive officer of Oslo University Hospital; 2009–2011	Succeeded by Jan Eirik Thoresen (acting)
Preceded by Grace Reksten Skaugen	Chair of Entra Eiendom; 2012–present	Incumbent
Sporting positions
Preceded by (Austria) Richard Rubatscher	President of Organizing Committee for Winter Youth Olympic Games; 2016	Succeeded by (Switzerland) Patrick Baumann; Virginie Faivre
