= Ahus =

Ahus may refer to:

- Akershus University Hospital, a hospital near Oslo, Norway
- Åhus, a Swedish town
- Atypical Hemolytic-uremic syndrome, commonly abbreviated "aHUS"
