= Ringerike =

Ringerike refers to various areas and organizations in Norway:

- Ringerike (municipality)
- Ringerike (traditional district)

== Other meanings ==
- Ringerikes Blad
- Ringerike District Court
- Ringerike GP
- Ringerike Hospital
- Ringerike Line
- Ringerike Panthers
- Ringerike Prison
- Ringerike Style
