= Ringerike Hospital =

- Vestre Viken Hospital Trust
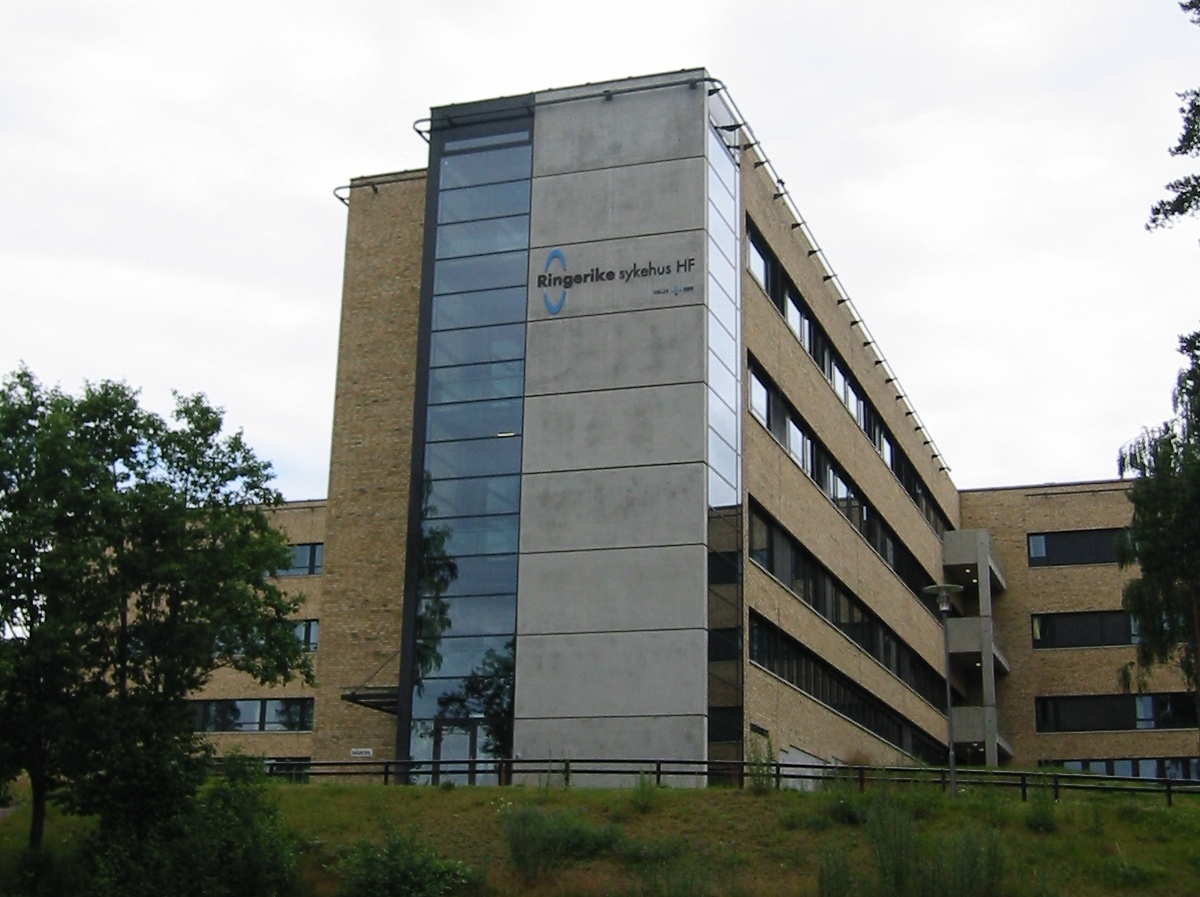
- Ringerike Hospital HF front

Geography
- Location: Buskerud, Norway
- Coordinates: 60.148°N 10.255°E

Organisation
- Type: General

Services
- Emergency department: Yes
- Beds: 872

Helipads
- Helipad: Yes
Number	Length		Surface
Number	ft	m	Surface
1	20	20

Links
- Website: www.ringerike-sykehus.no
- Lists: Hospitals in Norway

Ringerike Hospital is a hospital which deals with patients from the Buskerud area, especially around Hønefoss. The hospital is part of Vestre Viken Hospital Trust of Southern and Eastern Norway Regional Health Authority. It is the main hospital for around 75,000 people, with capacity for 872 in-patients. It serves people living in Ringerike Municipality, Hole Municipality, Jevnaker Municipality, and Sør-Aurdal Municipality, as well as parts of the rural Hallingdal and Valdres valleys. Included in its remit as hospital of Hønefoss, is the smaller clinic of Hallingdal Hospital at Ål. Ringerike Hospital deals with somatics and psychiatry, and in 2005 dealt with around 11,200 patients in surgery, internal medicine, psychiatry, birth and gynecology and paediatrics. In the same year, there were around 62,300 polyclinic consultations. Until 2009, the hospital was its own health trust, Ringerike Hospital Trust.

Hønefoss Heliport, Ringerike Hospital (ICAO: ENRX) is situated 50 meters (160 ft) from the emergency department. The helipad measures 20 by 20 meters (66 by 66 ft).
