= Lillehammer Hospital =

- Innlandet Hospital Trust
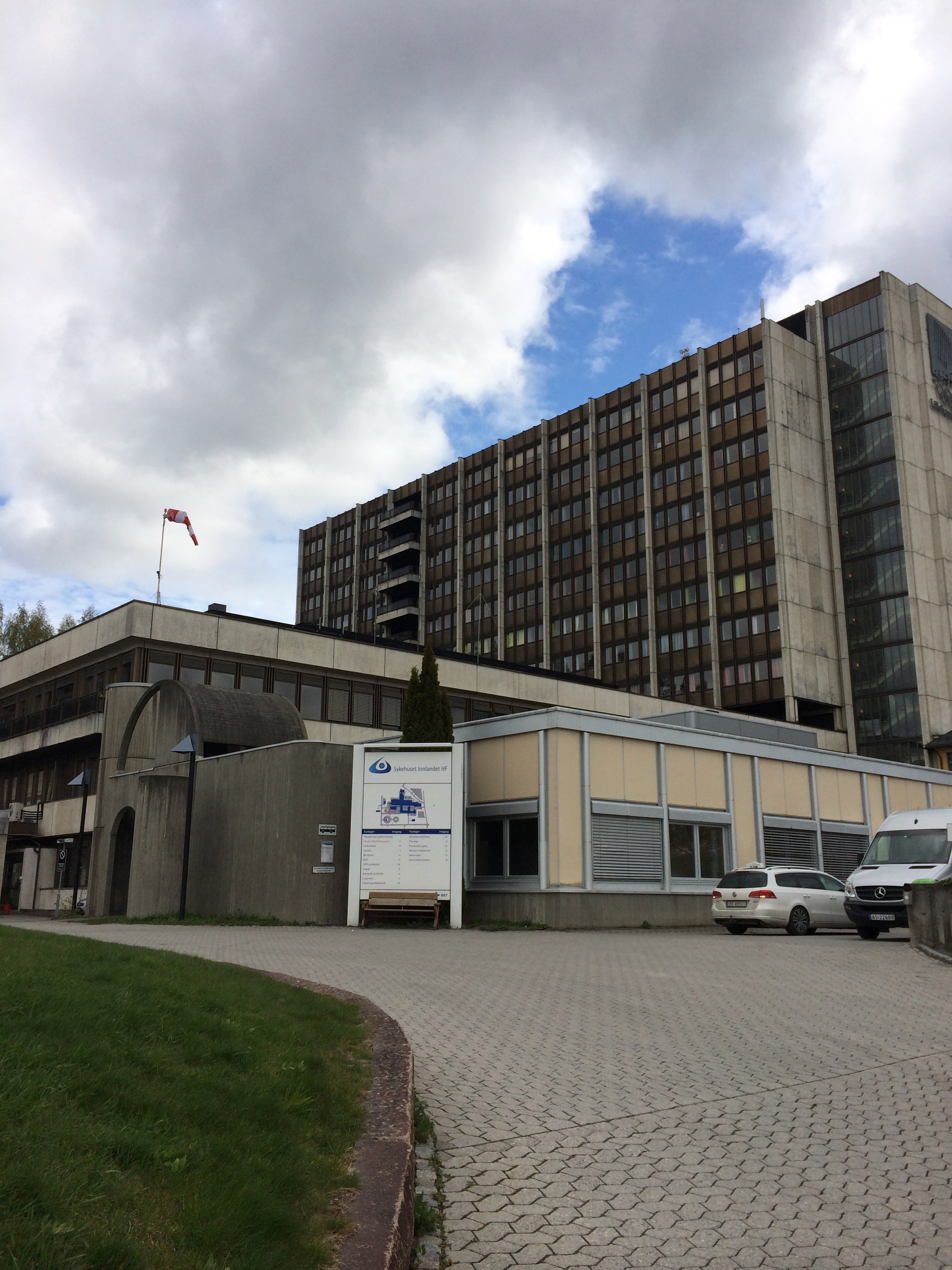
- Lillehammer Hospital

- Location in Norway

Geography
- Location: Lillehammer, Norway
- Coordinates: 61.113°N 10.473°E

Organisation
- Type: General

Services
- Emergency department: Yes

Helipads
- Helipad: ICAO: ENLH

History
- Founded: 1878; 148 years ago

Links
- Website: sykehuset-innlandet.no
- Lists: Hospitals in Norway

Lillehammer Hospital (Norwegian: Lillehammer sykehus) is a general hospital situated in Lillehammer, Norway. It is part of Innlandet Hospital Trust, part of the Southern and Eastern Norway Regional Health Authority.

Lillehammer Heliport, Innlandet Hospital (ICAO: ENLH) is an asphalt, ground helipad with a diameter of 18 meters (59 ft). It is located 20 meters (66 ft) from the emergency department and features a fuel tank.
