= Nordbyhagen =

- Village
- Location in Akershus
- Coordinates: 59°56′00″N 10°59′37″E
- Country: Norway
- Region: Østlandet
- County: Akershus
- Time zone: UTC+01:00 (CET)
  - Summer (DST): UTC+02:00 (CEST)

Nordbyhagen is a village in Akershus, Norway. The area is home to Akershus University Hospital (sometimes referred to as "Ahus").
