= Privatsykehuset Haugesund =

Private Hospital (Privatsykehuset) Haugesund
- Scanhealth Scandinavia

Geography
- Location: Rogaland, Norway
- Coordinates: 59.412020°N 5.271957°E

Organisation
- Type: General
- Affiliated university: Haugesund Røntgen Institutt, Klinikk Hausken

Services
- Beds: 20

History
- Opened: 1997

Links
- Website: www.privatsykehuset.no
- Lists: Hospitals in Norway

Private Hospital (Norwegion: Privatsykehuset) Haugesund is a private hospital located in Haugesund in Rogaland, Norway. Privatsykehuset Haugesund is part of Scanhealth Scandinavia.

Privatsykehuset Haugesund operates in partnership with Haugesund Røntgen Institutt (a private radiology centre) and Klinikk Hausken (a private infertility centre) all of which are situated in the center of Haugesund. Privatsykehuset Haugesund was established in 1997. It is co-located with Haugesund Medical Center (Haugesund Medisinske senter). The hospital has branches in orthopedics, eye surgery, urology, skin diseases, general surgery and plastic surgery. The hospital is licensed for 20 beds and operates both outpatient and inpatients.
