= Rikshospitalet–Radiumhospitalet =

Norwegian hospital trust

Coordinates: 59.9486°N 10.7153°E

Rikshospitalet–Radiumhospitalet HF
- Company type: Health trust
- Industry: Healthcare
- Founded: 1 January 2005
- Headquarters: Oslo, Norway
- Area served: Norway
- Parent: Southern and Eastern Norway Regional Health Authority
- Subsidiaries: Rikshospitalet; Norwegian Radium Hospital
- Website: www.rikshospitalet.no

Rikshospitalet–Radiumhospitalet Hospital Trust (Norwegian: Rikshospitalet–Radiumhospitalet HF) was created in 2005 when Rikshospitalet merged with the Norwegian Radium Hospital. The trust belongs to the Southern and Eastern Norway Regional Health Authority.

The board of directors is chaired by Steinar Marthinsen. Among the board members appointed by the Regional Health Authority, the politically appointed are Kristin Ørmen Johnsen, Barbro-Lill Hætta-Jacobsen, Eirik Moen, Sigbjørn Molvik and Maj-Britt Svastuen, and the other are Liv Arum, Randi Flesland and Stig Slørdahl. The employees' representatives are Vibeke Braastad Kristiansen, Mark Baekelandt, Pål Berdahl, Tiril Svensen and Elisabeth Emilsen.
