= Skien Hospital =

- Telemark Hospital Trust
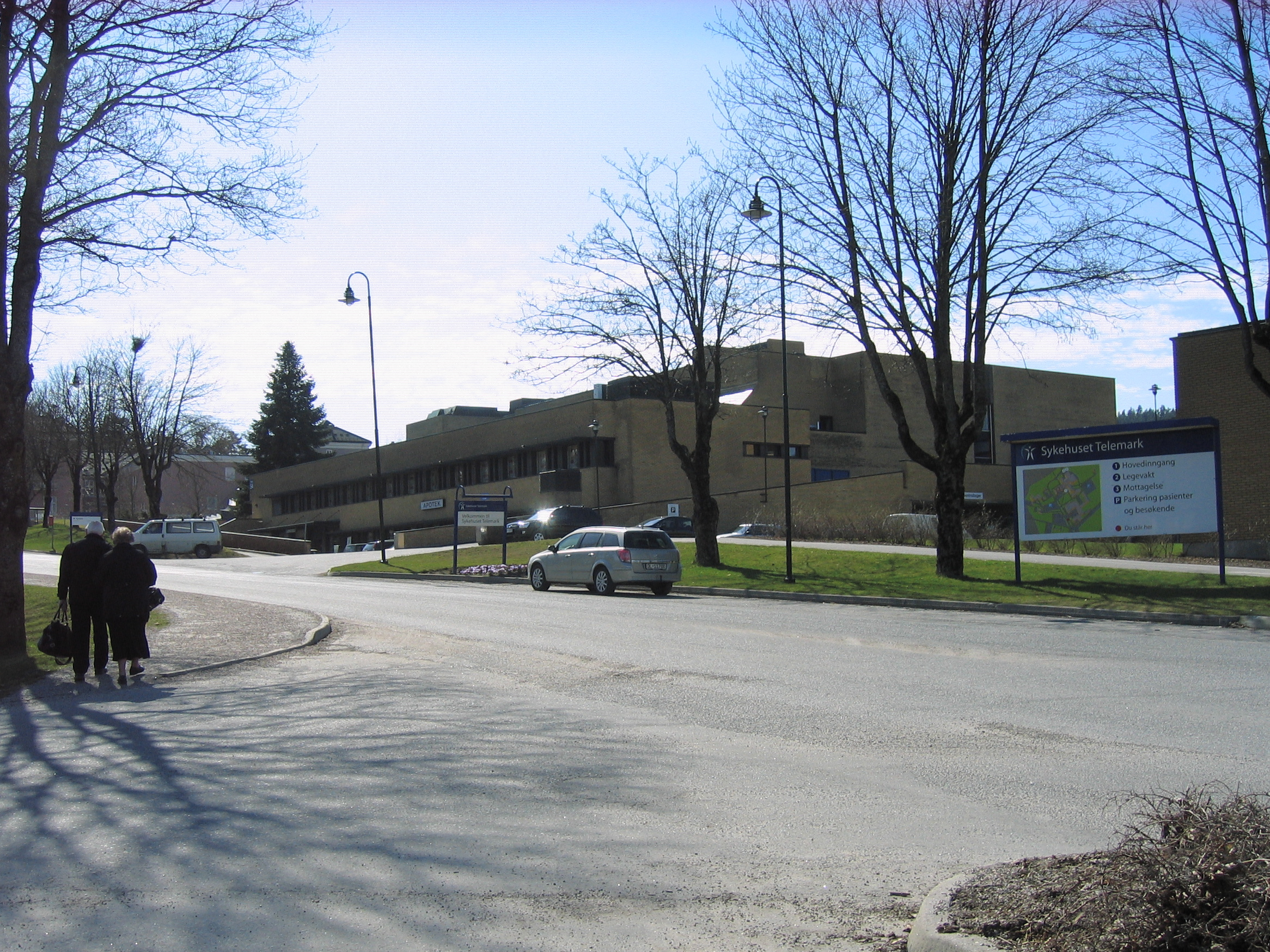

- Location in Norway

Geography
- Location: Skien, Norway
- Coordinates: 59.191°N 9.593°E

Organisation
- Type: General

Services
- Emergency department: Yes

Helipads
- Helipad: Yes

Links
- Website: sthf.no

Skien Hospital (Norwegian: Skien sykehus) is a general hospital situated in Skien, Telemark, Norway. It is the main facility of Telemark Hospital Trust, part of the Southern and Eastern Norway Regional Health Authority.

Skien Heliport, Hospital has an asphalt, ground helipad with a diameter of 20 meters (66 ft).
