= Sunnaas Rehabilitation Hospital =

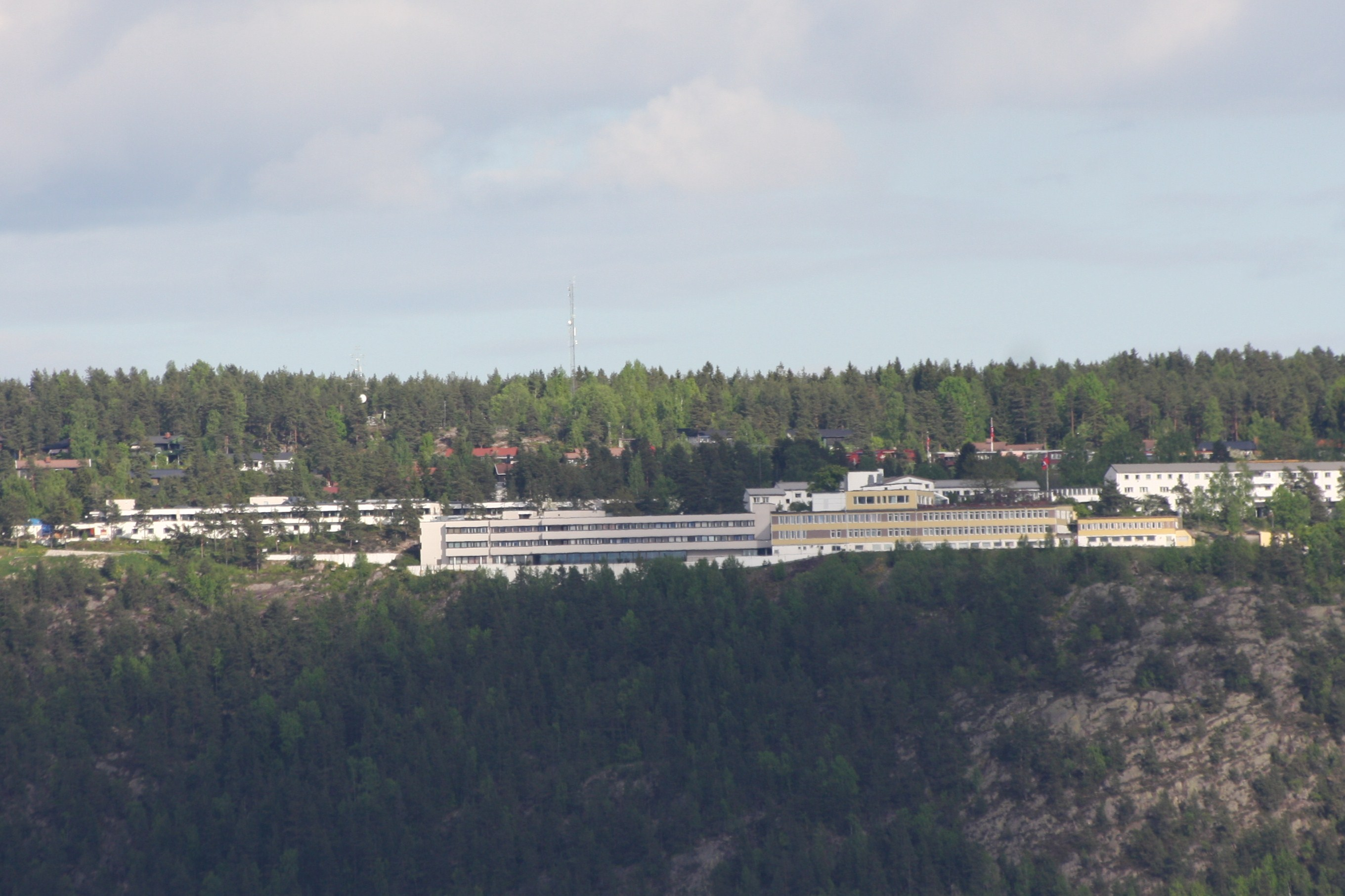
- Sunnaas Rehabilitation Hospital is on a hillside, with a good view over Oslofjorden.

Geography
- Location: Nesodden, Norway
- Coordinates: 59°50′04″N 10°38′25″E

History
- Opened: 1954

Links
- Website: www.sunnaas.no
- Lists: Hospitals in Norway

Sunnaas Rehabilitation Hospital is a hospital in Nesodden, Norway, and a health trust under Helse Sør-Øst. Sunnaas is the country's largest specialized hospital in physical medicine and rehabilitation. Patient services include cancer services, brain injuries after accidents or disease, multiple injuries, burns, and neurology. The rehabilitation program covers primary rehabilitation, controlled return, and patient programs. The hospital has policlinics in Oslo and on Nesodden and runs laboratory research on the hospital's behalf.

Research is a central part of the trust's work. The hospital has its own research department and uses both medical students and their own health personnel.

== History ==
Sunnaas Rehabilitation Hospital was founded by Rolf (1916–1979) and Birgit Sunnaas (1915–1992) in 1954. Neither Rolf Sunnaas nor his wife had medical education of any kind.

From the start, the institution had a strong working relationship with Ullevål Hospital (Oslo City Hospital) and got most of their patients from there. During the polio epidemic, with its culmination in 1951, young patients needed long treatment and rehabilitation, Sunnaas was asked to receive as many of them as his institution's capacity permitted. Sunnaas employing an experienced neurologist Nils Sponheim who thus was the first head medical doctor. He convinced the medical authorities in Oslo that the institution should be upgraded to hospital standard and deal with medical rehabilitation in cooperation with Oslo City Hospital. Over the following 20 years, Sponheim and a staff of doctors and physiotherapists made the hospital the country's foremost rehabilitation centre.

The hospital continued to grow until 1975. At that point, it had 247 beds. Oslo municipality took over ownership as a gift from the Sunnaas couple in 1979, but the city authorities wanted the state to take over the financial responsibility for the hospital. This included a commitment to deal with more complicated illnesses. In 1995 Sunnaas Rehabilitation Hospital became a University hospital, and after the national hospital reforms of 2002, it became its own health trust in Helse Øst. The administrative director is Einar Magnus Strand.

A more complete history of the hospital can be found in the book written for the hospital's 50th anniversary in 2004: Mitt Soria Moria Historien om Sunnaas sykehus by Egil Houg.
