= Elverum Hospital =

- Innlandet Hospital Trust
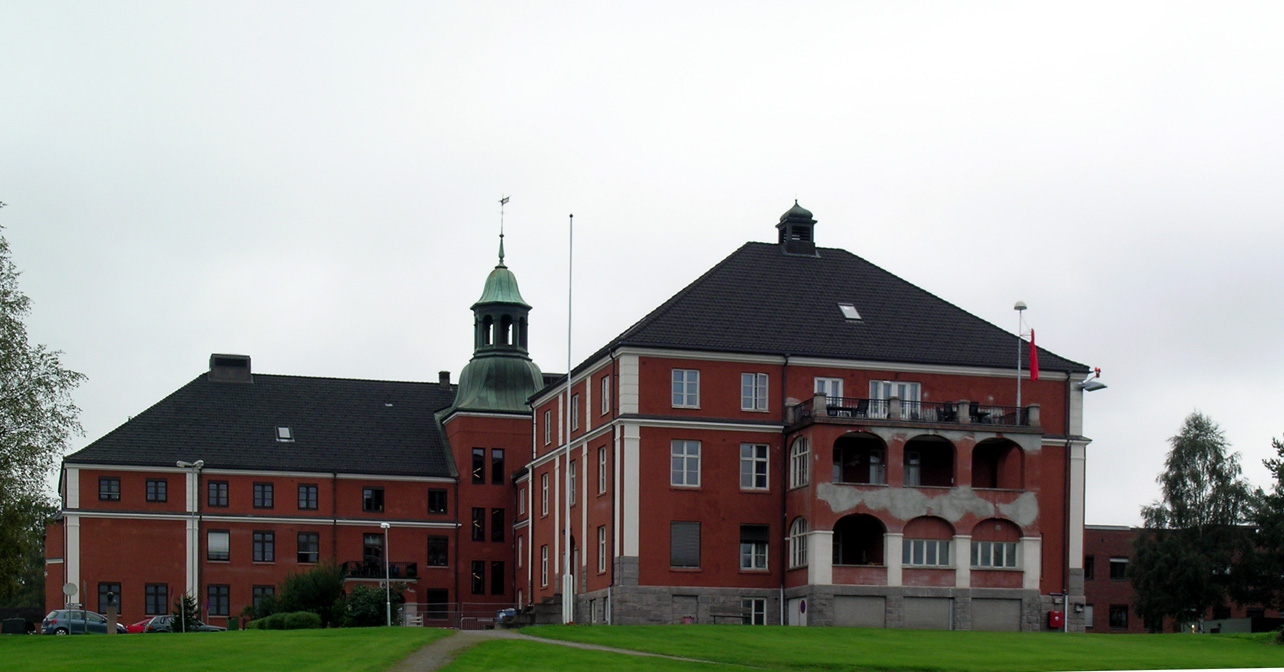

Geography
- Location: Elverum, Norway
- Coordinates: 60.877°N 11.572°E

Organisation
- Type: General

Services
- Emergency department: Yes

Helipads
- Helipad: ICAO: ENEL

History
- Founded: 1878

Links
- Website: sykehuset-innlandet.no

Elverum Hospital (Norwegian: Elverum sykehus) is a general hospital situated in the town of Elverum in Elverum Municipality in Innlandet county, Norway. It is part of Innlandet Hospital Trust, part of the Southern and Eastern Norway Regional Health Authority.

Elverum Heliport, Innlandet Hospital (ICAO: ENEL) is an asphalt, ground helipad with a diameter of 20 meters (66 ft). It is located 200 meters (660 ft) from the emergency department.
