= Sørlandet Hospital Arendal =

Hospital in Southern Norway

Coordinates: 58.46694°N 8.75483°E

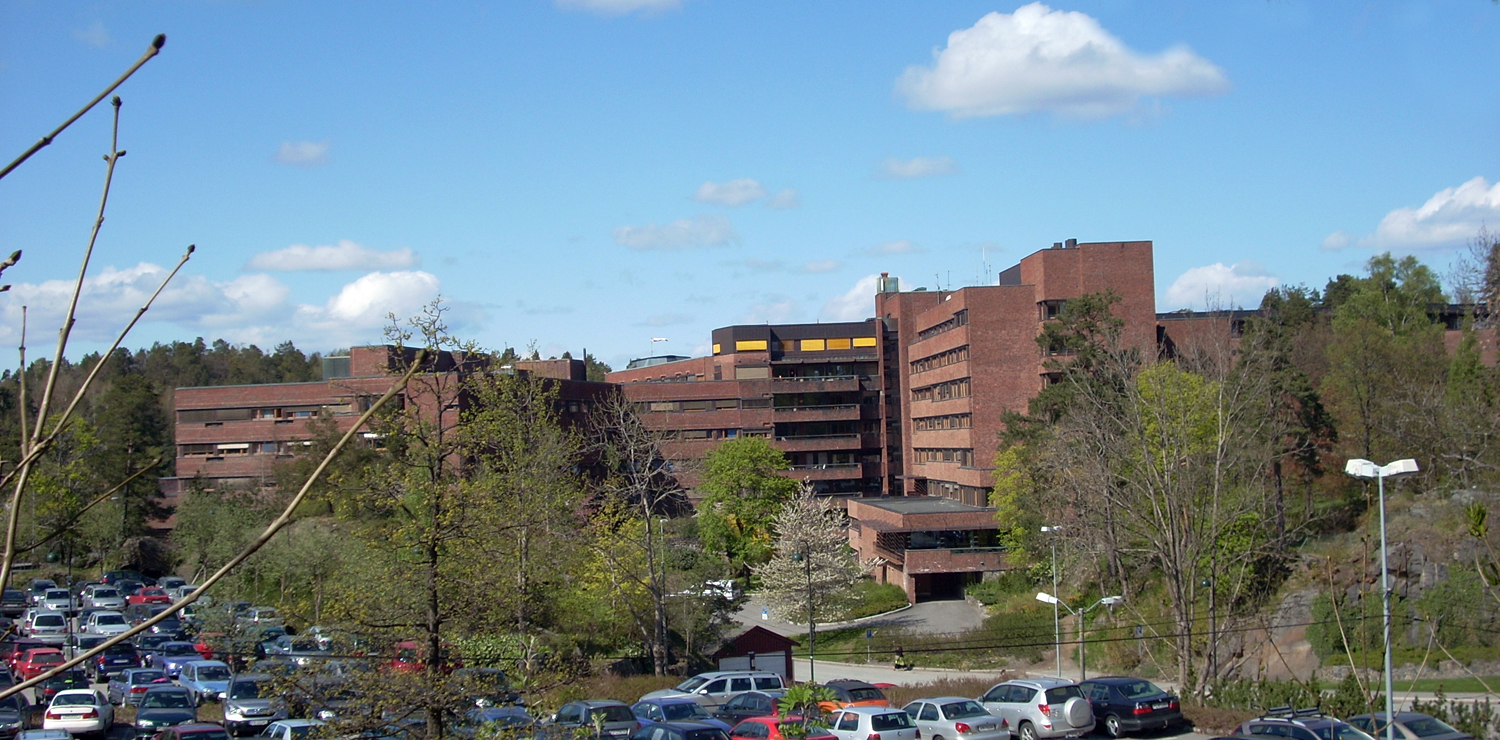
The hospital, seen from the north.

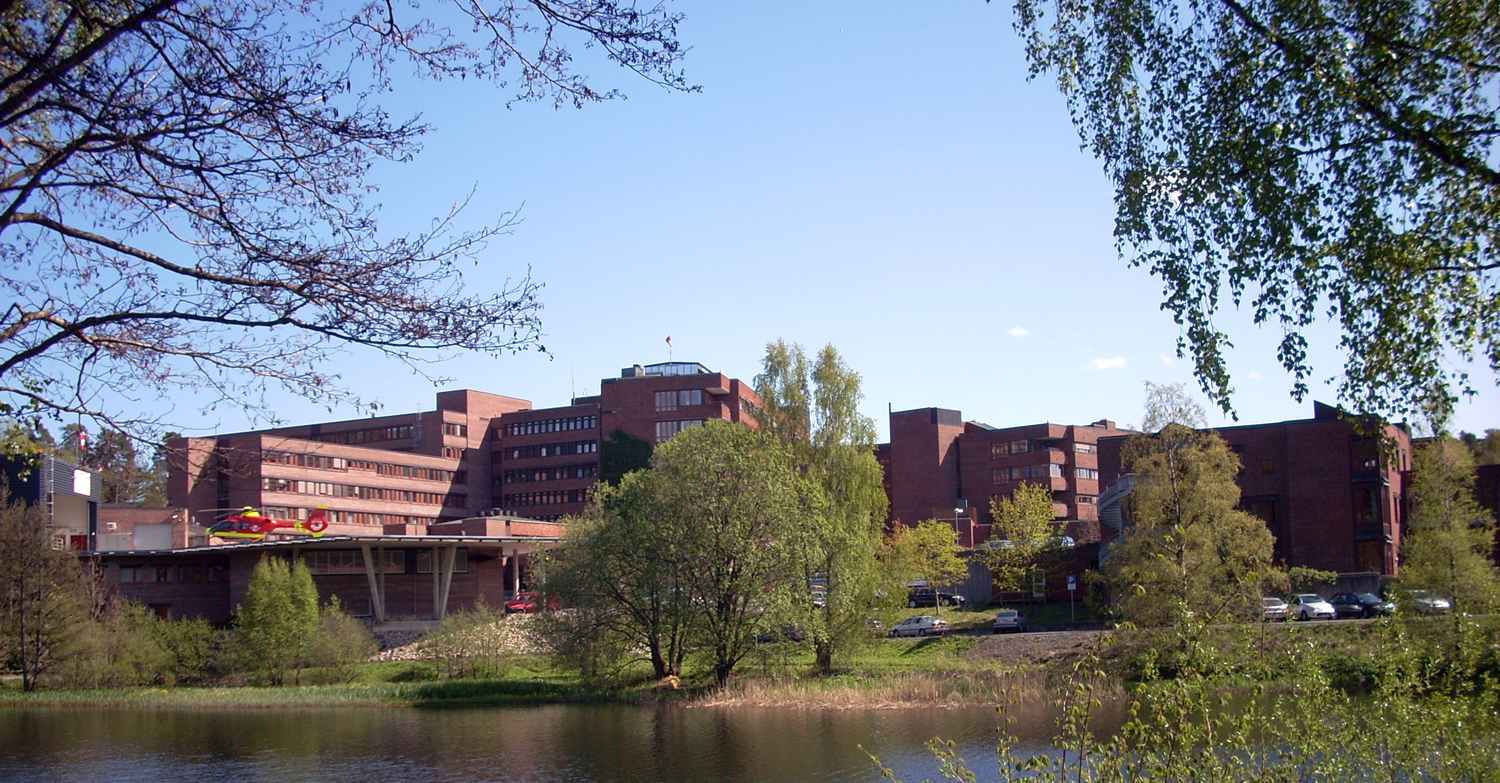
The hospital, seen from the southeast.

Sørlandet Hospital Arendal is one of the three regional hospitals in the Hospital of Southern Norway (trust). The hospital is located on Kloppene in Arendal Municipality in Agder county, Norway.

There are receipts for acute somatic disorders and surgery. There are also maternity clinic, psychiatric inpatient treatment, substance abuse and addiction treatment, and a clinic for mental health (psychiatry) and addiction treatment for adults. There is also a separate department for child- and adolescent psychiatry. (BUP).

There is an ambulance station and Arendal Heliport (Air medical services) at the hospital.
