= Oslo University Hospital, Rikshospitalet =

Oslo University Hospital, Rikshospitalet (The National Hospital)
- Oslo University Hospital

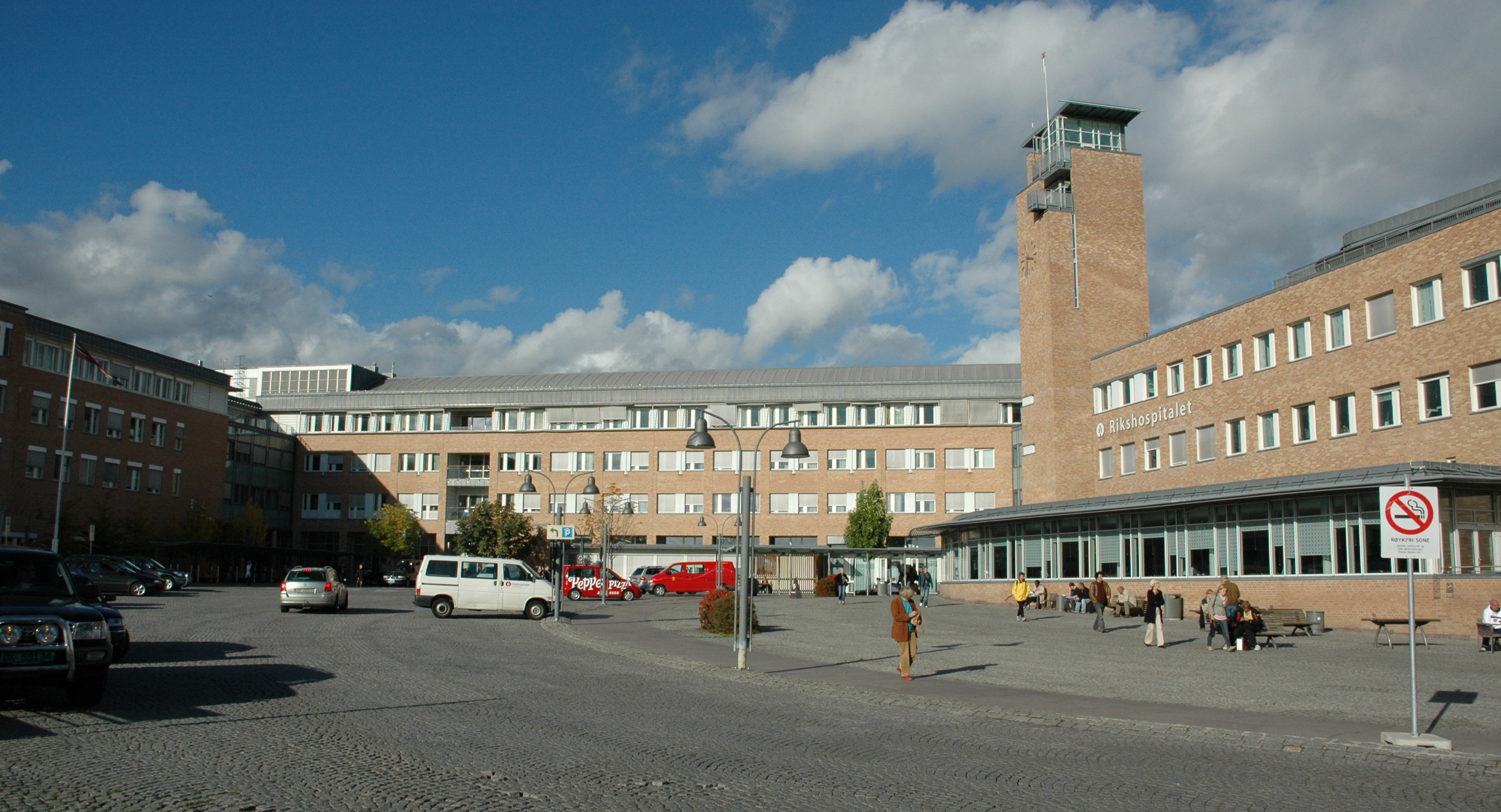

- Location within Norway

Geography
- Location: Gaustad, Oslo, Norway
- Coordinates: 59.9476°N 10.7146°E

Organisation
- Care system: Southern and Eastern Norway Regional Health Authority
- Type: Teaching, District General
- Affiliated university: University of Oslo

Services
- Emergency department: Yes
- Beds: 585

Helipads
- Helipad: ICAO: ENRH

History
- Founded: 1826; 200 years ago

Links
- Website: https://oslo-universitetssykehus.no/steder/rikshospitalet
- Lists: Hospitals in Norway

Oslo University Hospital, Rikshospitalet, is one of the four main campuses of Oslo University Hospital in Oslo, Norway. It was an independent hospital, Rigshospitalet, later spelled Rikshospitalet ("The National Hospital"), from 1826 to 2009, when it merged with other university hospitals in Oslo.

It is a highly specialized university hospital with special assignments in research and the development of new methods of treatment. Rikshospitalet is a part of Southern and Eastern Norway Regional Health Authority, and is affiliated with the University of Oslo.

About 60% of the patients admitted to Rikshospitalet are referred from other hospitals in Norway for more specialized investigations and treatment. In Norway, Rikshospitalet plays an important part with expert knowledge of the treatment of rare and complicated disorders. Rikshospitalet covers the whole country in various fields, including organ and bone marrow transplants, advanced neurosurgery, and treatment of children with congenital malformations. Rikshospitalet is also responsible for health care to the Norwegian royal family.

Rikshospitalet had 585 beds as of 2005. It is renowned for its architecture. Rikshospitalet merged in 2005 with the Norwegian Radium Hospital to create Rikshospitalet–Radiumhospitalet. The English form of the name was The University Hospital Rikshospitalet-Radiumhospitalet. Later (in October 2007) the notation was changed to "Rikshospitalet HF" (Rikshospitalet University Hospital HF) and that name now covers what used to be 12 different governmental hospitals (Rikshospitalet, Radiumhospitalet, Geilomo, Strålesatelitt ved Sykehuset Innlandet, Hjertesenteret i Oslo, Epilepsisenteret SSE, Spesialsykehuset for rehabilitering i Stavern, Voksentoppen, Spesialsykehuset for rehabilitating i Kristiansand, Nordagutu opptreningssenter og kvinneklinikken Føderiket), each with their own specialties and now under the same "branding". The Hospital carries out 1.2 Million treatments annually. It also performs 50% of medical research in Norway.

The hospital is the last stop on the Ullevål Hageby Line of the Oslo Tramway. Rikshospitalet Station is served by lines 17 and 18. Oslo Heliport, Rikshospitalet (ICAO: ENRH) consists of a 20.55-meter (67.4 ft) diameter helipad 20 meters (66 ft) from the emergency department.

== History ==
It was previously located between Ullevålsveien and Pilestredet—roads in Oslo.

1 April 1944, a radio station of The Resistance, located in the loft of Women's Clinic, was raided on 1 April 1944. (Knut Haugland shot four, and escaped.)

It moved to its current location in 1999.

On 28 August 2026, Harald V of Norway, aged 89, died at the hospital, where he had been receiving treatment for a bacterial blood infection. His son and successor, Haakon VIII, was born there in 1973.
