= Finnmark Hospital Trust =

Norwegian health trust

Finnmark Hospital Trust (Norwegian: Finnmarkssykehuset, Northern Sami: Finnmárkku buohcciviessu) is a health trust which serves Finnmark county, Norway. The trust is part of Northern Norway Regional Health Authority and headquartered in Hammerfest. It operates two hospitals, Hammerfest Hospital and Kirkenes Hospital. In addition it operates a decentralized psychiatric service.
