= Oslo University Hospital =

Coordinates: 59.95°N 10.72°E

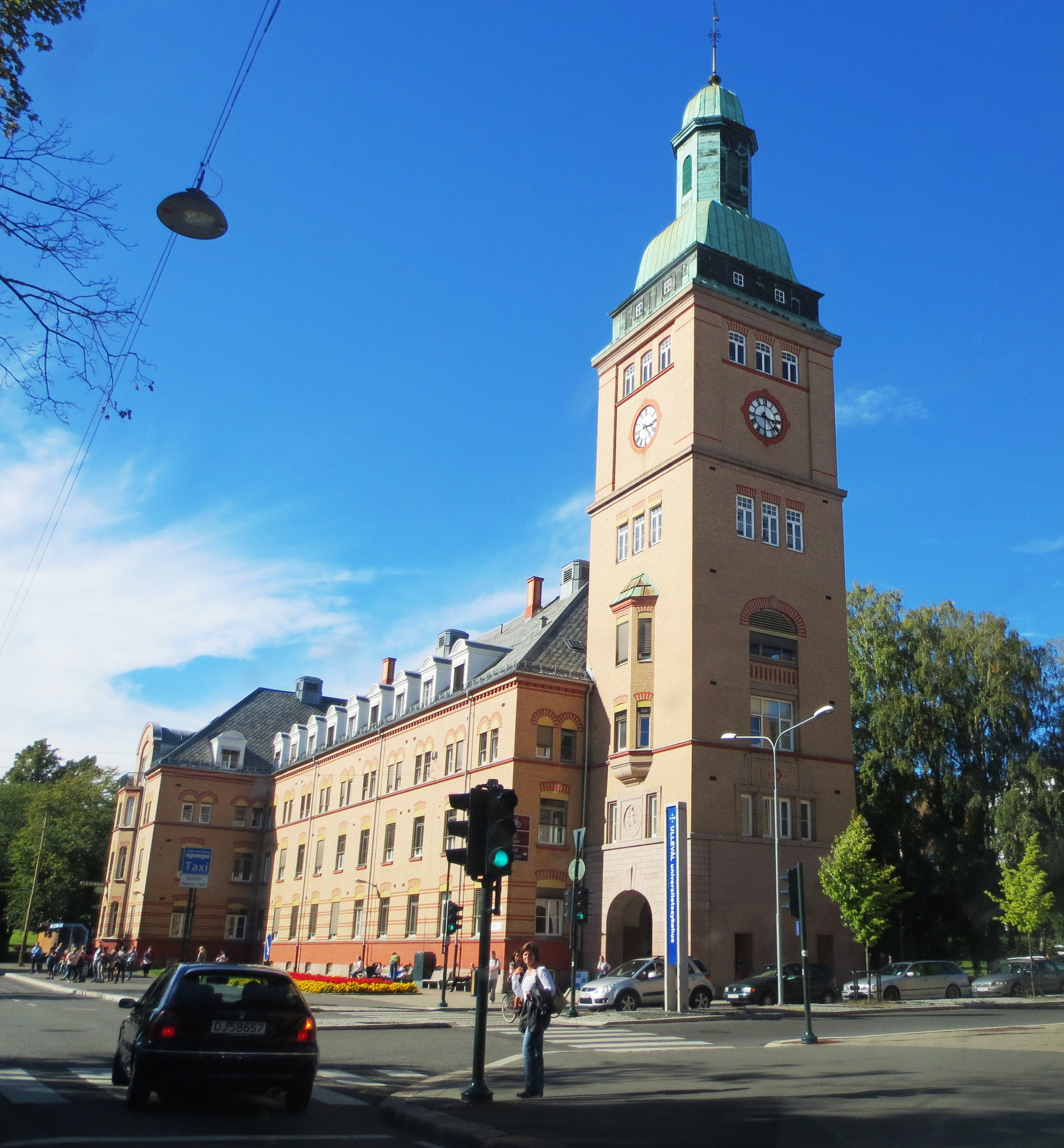
- Main building of Oslo University Hospital, currently used by the director's office

Geography
- Location: Oslo, Norway

Organisation
- Type: University hospital
- Affiliated university: University of Oslo

Services
- Emergency department: Yes, Level I trauma center
- Beds: 1,870

Helipads
- Helipad: ICAO: ENUH

History
- Founded: 1756 (Akershus Regional Hospital); 1807 (Military Hospital); 1814 (Faculty of Medicine); 1826 (Rikshospitalet); 1855 (Gaustad Hospital); 1887 (Ullevål Hospital); 1895 (Aker Hospital); 1932 (Norwegian Radium Hospital); 2009 (Oslo University Hospital)

Links
- Website: www.oslouniversitetssykehus.no
- Lists: Hospitals in Norway

Oslo University Hospital (Norwegian: Oslo universitetssykehus; OUS) is a university hospital in Oslo, Norway. With over 24,000 employees it is the largest hospital organization in Europe. It is affiliated with the Faculty of Medicine of the University of Oslo and is one of the largest medical research institutions in Europe.

Its oldest predecessor, Rikshospitalet (The National Hospital), was established as Norway's national teaching hospital in 1826 mainly on the basis of the Military Hospital founded in 1807, while its academic tradition dates back to the establishment of the Faculty of Medicine in 1814. From the late 19th century the hospital was established as one of Europe's most modern hospitals and leading medical research institutions. Oslo University Hospital was formed by the merger of the then-three university hospitals in Oslo in 2009.The hospital includes 325 buildings that are primarily spread across four main campuses in Oslo: Rikshospitalet, Ullevål, Aker and Radiumhospitalet. It is one of two university hospitals affiliated with the University of Oslo, alongside Akershus University Hospital.

== History ==
Oslo University Hospital was established on 1 January 2009 by the merger of three state-owned university hospitals in Oslo, all of which were affiliated with the University of Oslo:

- Rikshospitalet (The National Hospital; founded 1826)
- Ullevål University Hospital (founded 1887)
- Aker University Hospital (founded 1895)

Rigshospitalet (the pre-1907 spelling) was established as Norway's national teaching hospital affiliated with the university in 1826, mainly on the basis on the Military Hospital that had been established during the Napoleonic Wars in 1807. Rigshospitalet also incorporated Akershus Regional Hospital, founded 1756. The hospital's academic tradition dates back to the establishment of the Faculty of Medicine of the Royal Frederick University in 1814, which itself was a continuation of the traditions of the University of Copenhagen and Rigshospitalet in Copenhagen following the 1814 Dano–Norwegian split. In the late 19th century the Norwegian Parliament decided to develop Rigshospitalet as a "model hospital" that would be comparable to the world's then-leading hospitals, such as Germany's Charité. As a result, the hospital was massively expanded to become one of the most modern hospitals in the world, and a major research institution. Ullevål Hospital was established in 1887 and was a teaching hospital affiliated with the university from its very first years. During the 20th century Ullevål Hospital became Oslo's main municipal hospital, one of the largest hospitals in Scandinavia and a major medical research institution and teaching hospital. Aker Hospital was established in 1895 and became a teaching hospital affiliated with the university in 1948. Ullevål and Aker were transferred from the Oslo city government to the national government in 2002.Oslo University Hospital's predecessor institutions also include several specialized hospitals, such as the psychiatric hospital Gaustad Hospital (founded 1855), which was merged into Aker Hospital in 1996, and the Crown Princess Märtha Institute, Sophies Minde, the Hospital for Rheumatic Diseases, the Hospital for Epilepsy, the Hospital for Rehabilitation, Oslo Heart Centre and the Norwegian Radium Hospital, all of which were merged into Rikshospitalet.University of Oslo currently has two university hospitals, Oslo University Hospital and Akershus University Hospital. Oslo University Hospital is the oldest and largest of the two.

Oslo University Hospital has 1,870 beds as of 2018, which is set to increase to 2,300 by 2028.

In January 2022, the first patients in its program of Heroin-assisted treatment received that treatment; the number of patients has reached 30.

== Organisation and role ==
Oslo University Hospital employs over 24,000 staff, and is run as a public health trust.

The hospital consists of fourteen medical divisions in addition to a central management unit, the director's office, and a division that provides non-medical services to the rest of the hospital. Bjørn Atle Lein Bjørnbeth has been managing director since 2020.

The hospital has a total budget of NOK 22 billion (2017). Oslo University Hospital is an emergency hospital for East and Southern Norway and has national emergency cover. The hospital is furthermore responsible for ambulance services, the 113 emergency calls service (equivalent to 112, 999 or 911), air ambulance and patient transportation in Oslo and the County of Akershus. Oslo University Hospital is the largest teaching hospital in Norway and has a major role in the education of a large variety of health care personnel.

== Research ==
About 60% of the total medical research in Norwegian medical centres is carried out at Oslo University Hospital. The hospital is involved in extensive international and national network cooperation.

The hospital is Norway's national reference hospital, responsible for introducing and developing new medical examination methods, treatment methods and follow-ups.

== Directors ==
- Siri Hatlen (2009–2011)
- Bjørn Erikstein (2011–2019)
- Morten Reymert (2019–2020)
- Bjørn Atle Lein Bjørnbeth (2020–incumbent)
