= Helgeland Hospital Trust =

Norwegian health trust

Coordinates: 66°19′35″N 14°11′12″E

Helgeland Hospital Trust is a health trust covering Helgeland in Nordland, Norway. It is part of Northern Norway Regional Health Authority and was established on 1 January 2002. The main facilities are in Mo i Rana, Mosjøen and Sandnessjøen Hospital. It has a polyclinic in Brønnøysund. The director is Hulda Gunnlaugsdottir.
