= Østfold Hospital Trust =

Norwegian health trust

Coordinates: 59.2980°N 11.0680°E

Østfold Hospital Trust is a health trust in Norway with bases in Fredrikstad, Moss, Sarpsborg and Halden. It is owned by Southern and Eastern Norway Regional Health Authority.
