= Vestre Viken Hospital Trust =

Norwegian health trust

Logo

Vestre Viken Hospital Trust (Norwegian: Vestre Viken HF) is a health trust which covers Buskerud, Asker and Bærum. The trust is owned by Southern and Eastern Norway Regional Health Authority and is headquartered in Drammen. It covers an area with 470,000 residents in 26 municipalities. Vestre Viken has 9,500 employees.

Vestre Viken operates Bærum Hospital, Drammen Hospital, Kongsberg Hospital and Ringerike Hospital in Hønefoss. It also operates them medical center Hallingdal Hospital in Ål. It also runs the ambulance service with fifteen bases.

== Drammen Hospital ==
Drammen Hospital
- Vestre Viken Hospital Trust
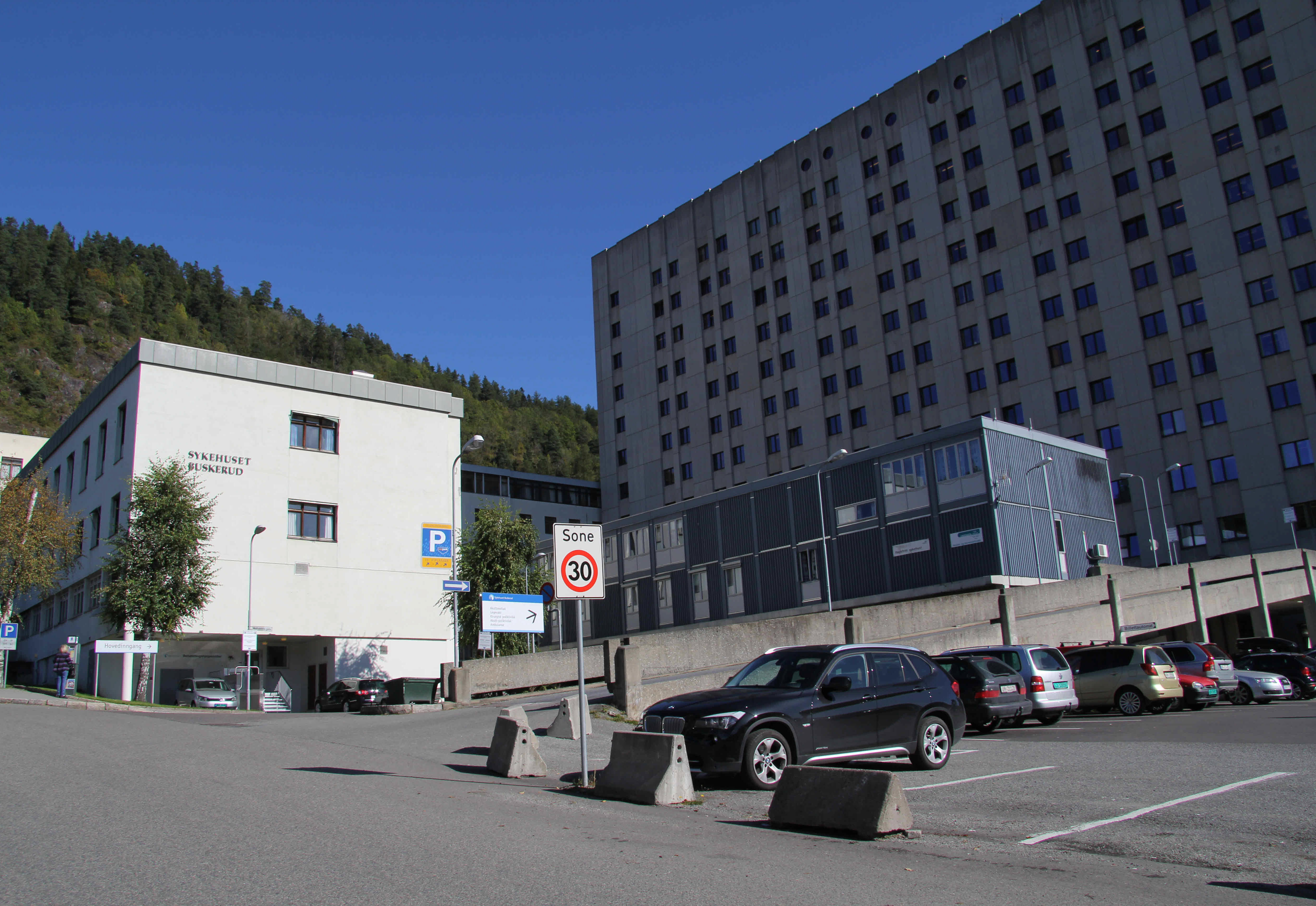

- Location in Norway

Geography
- Location: Drammen, Norway
- Coordinates: 59.748°N 10.198°E

Organisation
- Type: General

Services
- Emergency department: Yes

Helipads
- Helipad: ICAO: ENDH

History
- Founded: 1878

Links
- Website: vestreviken.no

Drammen Hospital (Norwegian: Drammen sjukehus), previously Buskerud Central Hospital, is a general hospital situated in Drammen, Norway. It is the largest hospital which is part of Vestre Viken Hospital Trust, part of the Southern and Eastern Norway Regional Health Authority.

Drammen Heliport, Hospital (ICAO: ENDH) is an asphalt, ground helipad with a diameter of 20.55 meters (67.4 ft). It can no longer be used by the 330 Squadron and their Westland Sea King helicopters after an expansion of the parking lot in 2012.
