= Oslo University Hospital, Ullevål =

Coordinates: 59.9370°N 10.7372°E

Ullevål
- Oslo University Hospital

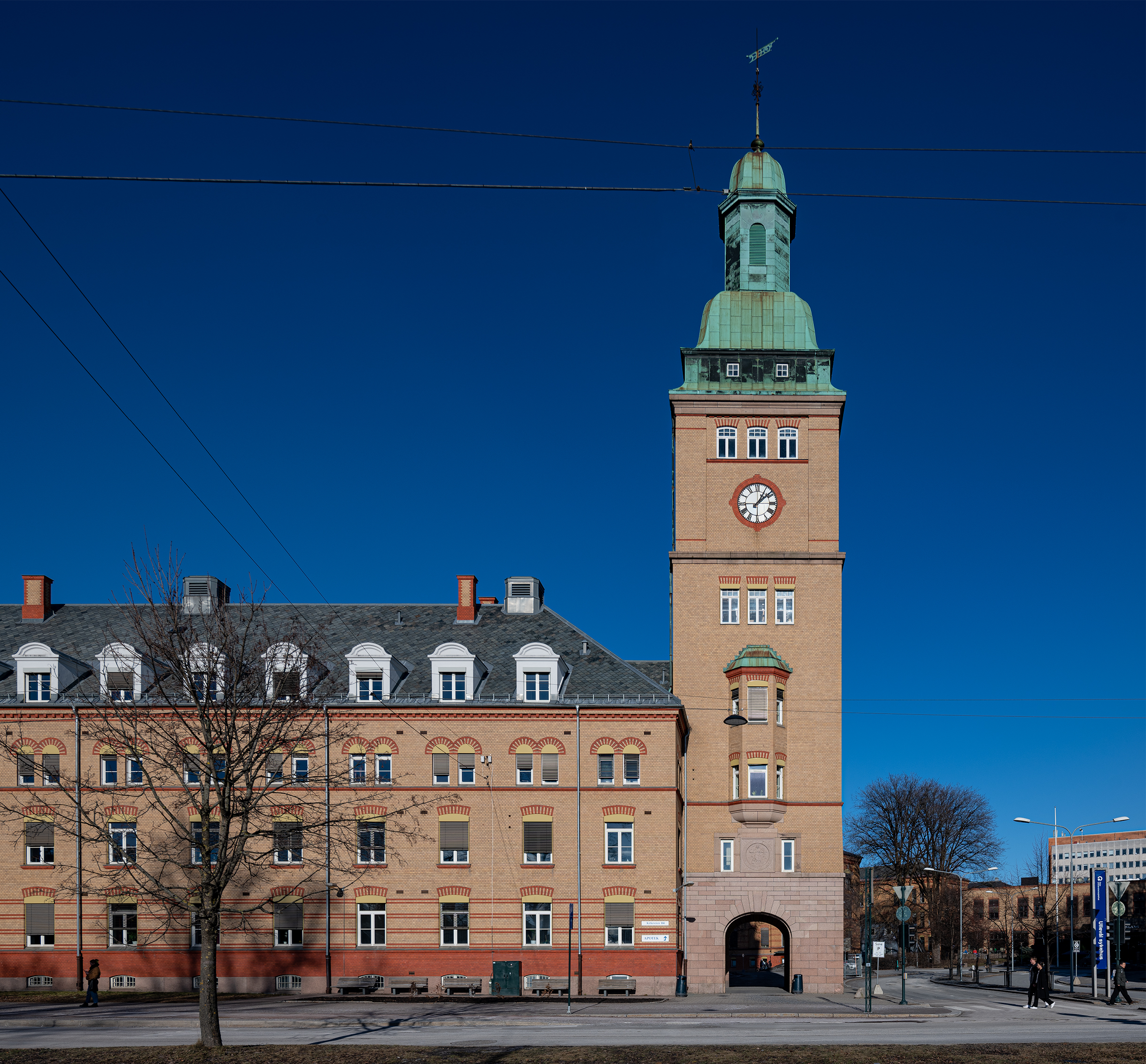
- Main administration building

- Location in Oslo Oslo University Hospital, Ullevål (Norway)

Geography
- Location: Oslo, Norway

Organisation
- Type: Teaching
- Affiliated university: University of Oslo

Services
- Emergency department: Yes, Level I trauma center
- Beds: 1,200

Helipads
- Helipad: ICAO: ENUH

History
- Founded: 1887

Links
- Website: http://www.ulleval.no
- Lists: Hospitals in Norway

Oslo University Hospital, Ullevål (Norwegian: Oslo universitetssykehus, Ullevål), formerly Ullevål University Hospital (Norwegian: Ullevål universitetssykehus) in Oslo, Norway is the largest of the four main campuses of Oslo University Hospital. It was opened in 1887, and was an independent hospital owned by Oslo municipality and then by the state until it became part of Oslo University Hospital in 2009. It is a Level I trauma center and includes patient treatment, research, teaching and administration activities. The headquarters of Oslo University Hospital was located at Ullevål until 2024.

Oslo Heliport, Ullevål (ICAO: ENUH) is a helipad with a 30.55 meters (100.2 ft) diameter located on the top of a parking garage. It has a walkway to the emergency department. The helipad features a fuel tank.

== See also ==
Oslo University Hospital, Aker
University of Oslo
Oslo University Hospital
Ullevål sykehus tram stop
