= Akershus University Hospital =

Akershus University Hospital ("Ahus")
- Helse Sør-Øst

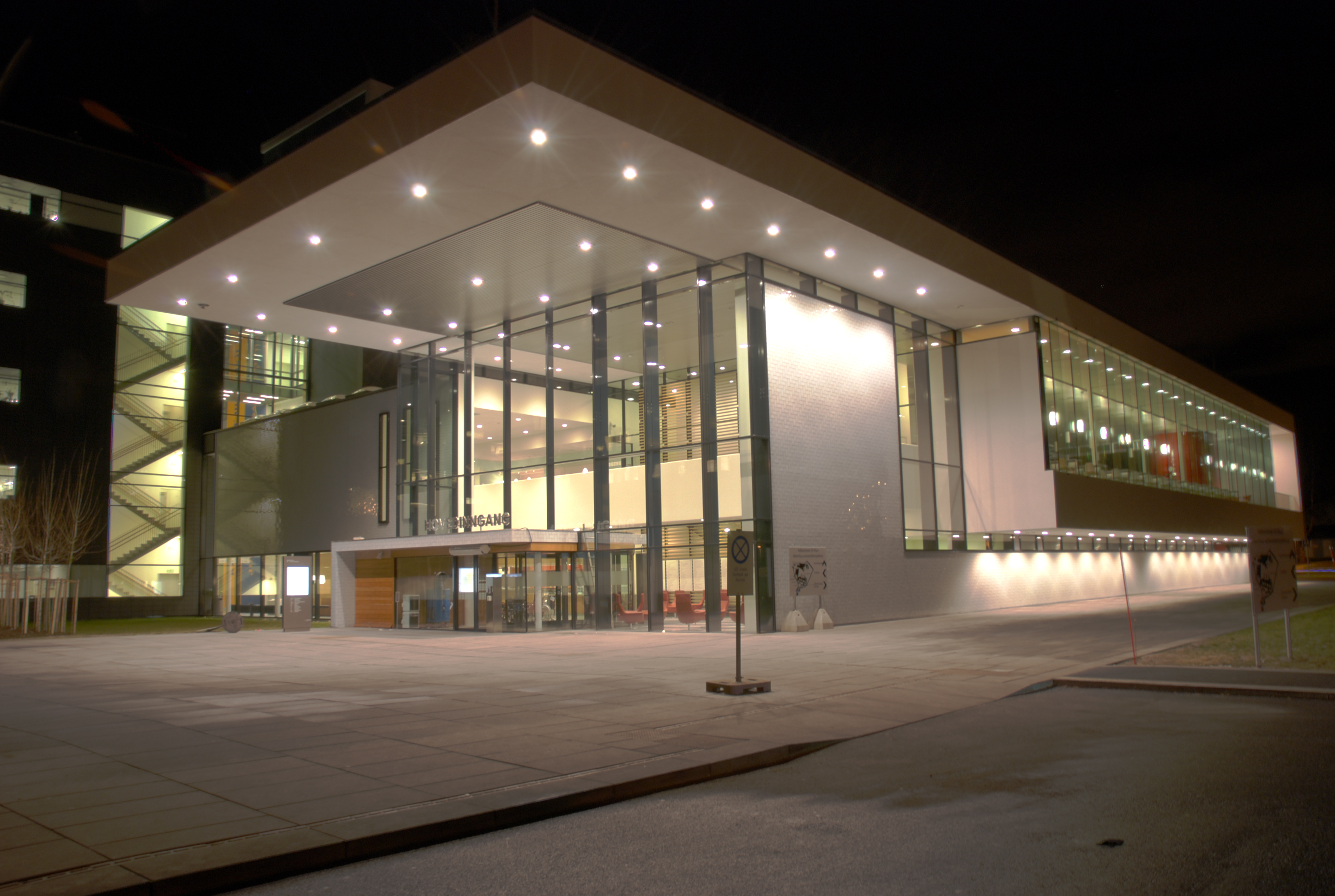
- The main entrance of Akershus universitetssykehus

Geography
- Location: Sykehusveien 25, 1478 Lørenskog, Sykehusveien 25, Lørenskog, Norway
- Coordinates: 59.933°N 10.996°E

Organisation
- Type: Teaching
- Affiliated university: University of Oslo
- Network: Southern and Eastern Norway Regional Health Authority

Services
- Emergency department: Yes
- Beds: 953

Helipads
- Helipad: Yes

History
- Founded: 1961 (Current building from November 2008)

Links
- Website: http://www.ahus.no
- Lists: Hospitals in Norway

Akershus University Hospital (Norwegian: Akershus universitetssykehus, abbreviated Ahus) is a Norwegian public university hospital in the Greater Oslo Region. It is located in the Lørenskog municipality in Akershus county, northeast of the Norwegian capital Oslo. It is a teaching hospital and one of two university hospitals affiliated with the University of Oslo, alongside the larger Oslo University Hospital. The hospital has around 10,000 employees and a capacity of around 950 beds. In 2018, there were approximately 2,600 health, medical, and nursing students in placements or internships within the hospital.

== History ==
Akershus University Hospital was officially opened on 15 May 1961 as the Akershus Central Hospital (SIA). The area on which it was built, Nordbyhagen in Lørenskog eventually became developed with more homes and apartments, nursery schools, convenience stores, and several buildings associated with hospital functions. In 1978, the hospital began its second major phase, and it has since built a series of individual buildings and minor additions to the hospital.

The Norwegian Parliament (the Storting) decided in 1999 that the then Central Hospital of Akershus (SIA) would be a teaching hospital. The first teaching program started in 2001 and was expanded to cover the full study period soon after. Today the "faculty division" is one of the ten departments affiliated with the Faculty of Medicine at the University of Oslo.

=== The new hospital ===
In 2003 the Norwegian parliament gave the go-ahead for a new University Hospital in Akershus to be built. On 18 December 2003, the executive board at the Southern and Eastern Norway Regional Health Authority determined that construction work would start in March 2004. It was to be designed by the Danish architects from the firm C.F Møller and was estimated to cost around $1.7bn. On 1 March 2004 Health Minister Dagfinn Høybråten turned the sod. In October 2008, the new hospital building designed by Danish architects Arkitektfirmaet C. F. Møller opened. Setting new standards for hospital architecture in Norway, at the time of its construction, it was claimed to be the most modern in Europe.

== The research center ==
After Akershus University Hospital became a teaching hospital in 2000, a separate Center for Research (Norwegian: Forskningssenteret) was established. Since then, the research center has taken an increasingly central place in the hospital. The hospital houses 26 separate research groups working on somatic and psychiatric topics.

The Hospital aims to ensure that both the research and teaching at the hospital maintain a high professional level and that the foundation of research activity must center on the hospital's own patients. The research aims to improve both diagnosis and treatment methodologies, using progressive, modern technology while maintaining cost-effectiveness.

Research is undertaken in all departments of the hospital. The research center is responsible for approximately 250 scientific publications per year, in some of the world's leading journals. In 2012, an article featuring research on fear during childbirth received international attention.

== Arts and decorations ==
Akershus University Hospital was constructed alongside a special art project. Research has shown that experiencing art has positive health effects and helps treat illnesses such as hypertension, and the hope was that the art would open patients to different cognitive and sensory experiences. The art collection currently includes twelve major works, which were designed specifically for their unique space. They are found both inside the "glass street" (the main hallway/atrium) or outdoors around the campus. The art collection now includes unrelated works, such as drawings, paintings, and photographs, as well as a new exhibition of a selection of photos from the old hospital building. The artists desired for their work to be read and experienced as art, even if it is integrated into the building's architecture.

Many of the original works are of renowned artists including; Troels Wörsel, Tony Cragg, Julie Nord, Per Sundberg, Ernst Billgren and Vesa Honkonen.

== Specialties ==
Internal medicine with sub-specialties, Neurology, Pediatrics, Paediatric rehabilitation, Physiotherapy.

Surgery with sub-specialties Orthopedics, Otorhinolaryngology, Anesthesia, Obstetrics and gynecology.

Clinical Chemistry and Nuclear Medicine, Immunology and Transfusion Medicine, Microbiology, Pathological anatomy, Radiology

Adult and child Psychiatry, Adult rehabilitation

== Directors ==
- 19??-1998: Yngve Haugstvedt (Krf)
- 1998-2003: Øystein Dolva
- 2003-2005: Are Helseth (Ap)
- 2005-2009: Erik Kreyberg Normann (H)
- 2009-2010: Øyvind Graadal (acting)
- 2010–2013 Hulda Gunnlaugsdottír (Ap)
- 2013–2014: Stein Vaaler (acting)
- 2014–present: Øystein Mæland (Ap)

== See also ==
- University of Oslo
- Lørenskog
- List of hospitals in Norway
