= Southern and Eastern Norway Regional Health Authority =

Norwegian regional health authority

Helse Sør-Øst RHF
- Company type: Regional health authority
- Industry: Healthcare
- Founded: 1 June 2007
- Headquarters: Hamar, Norway
- Area served: Southern and Eastern Norway
- Key people: Terje Rootwelt (acting CEO); Svein I. Gjedrem (chair)
- Revenue: ▲NOK 88,5 billion (2020)
- Operating income: NOK −2.6 billion (2020)
- Number of employees: 81,000 (2020)
- Parent: Norwegian Ministry of Health and Care Services
- Website: www.helse-sorost.no

The South-Eastern Norway Regional Health Authority (Norwegian: Helse Sør-Øst RHF) is the largest of the four regional health authorities in Norway. It covers the counties of Akershus, Agder, Buskerud, Innlandet, Oslo, Telemark, Vestfold and Østfold, with 57% of the total population in Norway. The authority owns ten health trusts that operate the hospitals as well as the Hospital Pharmacy Enterprise that operates seventeen pharmacies and Sykehuspartner Trust that operates the information technology systems.

The authority is subordinate to the Norwegian Ministry of Health and Care Services and was created on 1 June 2007 when Eastern Norway Regional Health Authority and Southern Norway Regional Health Authority merged.

The regional health authority operates the following health trusts:

- Akershus University Hospital
- Oslo University Hospital
- Sunnaas Rehabilitation Hospital
- Vestfold Hospital Trust
- Innlandet Hospital Trust
- Telemark Hospital Trust
- Østfold Hospital Trust
- Hospital of Southern Norway
- Vestre Viken Hospital Trust
- Southern and Eastern Norway Pharmaceutical Trust
- Sykehuspartner Trust
