= List of pharmacies =

This article is a list of pharmacies (also known as chemists and drugstores) by country.

== Algeria ==
Pharmacies in Algeria are independently owned by licensed pharmacists

- Laouisset Pharmacy

== Australia ==
Pharmacies in Australia are mostly independently owned by pharmacists, often operated as franchises of retail brands offered by the three major pharmaceutical wholesalers in Australia: Australian Pharmaceutical Industries (API), Sigma Pharmaceuticals and EBOS Group. A minority of pharmacies are owned by friendly societies, particularly in Victoria and South Australia.

- Chemist Warehouse
- TerryWhite Chemmart
- Priceline Pharmacies
- Amcal

== Canada ==
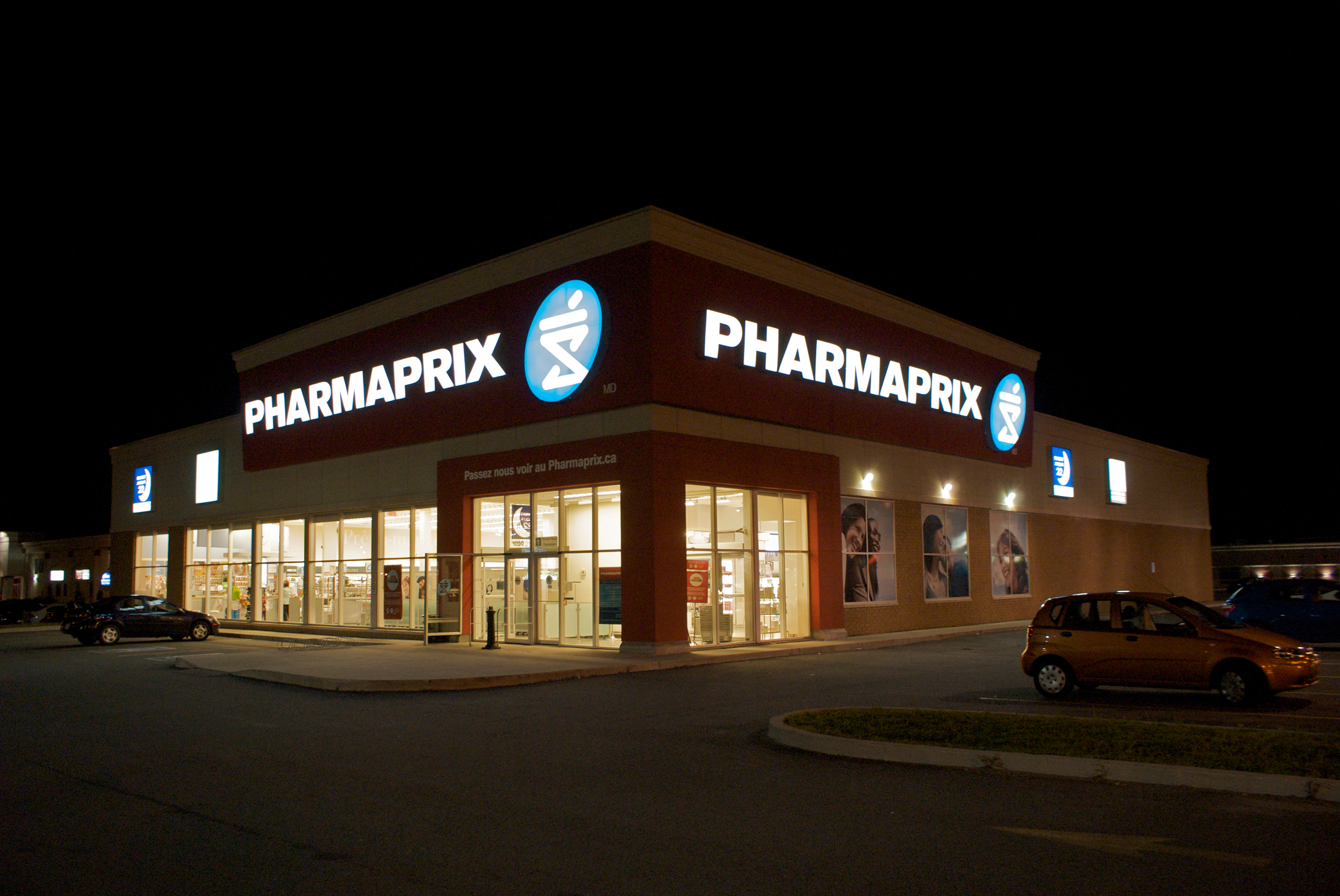
Pharmaprix drugstore in Alma

- Brunet
- Costco
- DRUGStore Pharmacy
- Familiprix
- Jean Coutu
- Lawtons
- London Drugs
- PharmaChoice
- Pharmasave
- Proxim (merger of Essaim and Santé Services)
- Rexall
- Shoppers Drug Mart (Pharmaprix in Quebec)
- Uniprix
- Value Drug Mart
- Walmart

=== Online pharmacies ===
- Canadian International Pharmacy Association

=== Defunct chains ===
- Cadieux (acquired by Jean Coutu in 1987)
- Cumberland Drugs (acquired by Uniprix 53 and Jean Coutu 19 in 1997)

== China ==
The key players in the drugstore industry in China are:

- China Nepstar – Shenzhen-based; China's largest
- Super-Pharm – Israeli company; had about 65 stores in China as of 2007
- Watsons – owned by HK-based Hutchison Whampoa

=== Hong Kong ===
- Mannings
- Watsons

==== Defunct chains ====
- CR Care (subsidiary of CR Vanguard , closed in 2024)

=== Macau ===
- Watsons

== Denmark ==
In Denmark, all pharmacies are owned by the Association of Danish Pharmacies and controlled by the state. There are two pharmaceutically trained groups with a higher education in the Danish pharmacies: pharmaconomists (Danish: farmakonomer) and pharmacists (farmaceuter). There are also pharmacy technicians (defektricer) who have a vocational training and unskilled laborers/workers (servicemedarbejdere) who perform manual labour.

== Germany ==
In Germany, pharmacies are known as Apotheken. As in France, they are all independently owned by pharmacists, and as in France, there are no pharmacy chains.

=== Online pharmacy ===
- Celesio
- dm-drogerie markt

== India ==
- MedPlus
- Apollo Pharmacy

Online Pharmacies

- Pharmeasy
- TATA 1MG

== Indonesia ==
- Kimia Farma
- Guardian Pharmacy
- Watsons

== Ireland ==
- Lloyds Pharmacy

== Israel ==
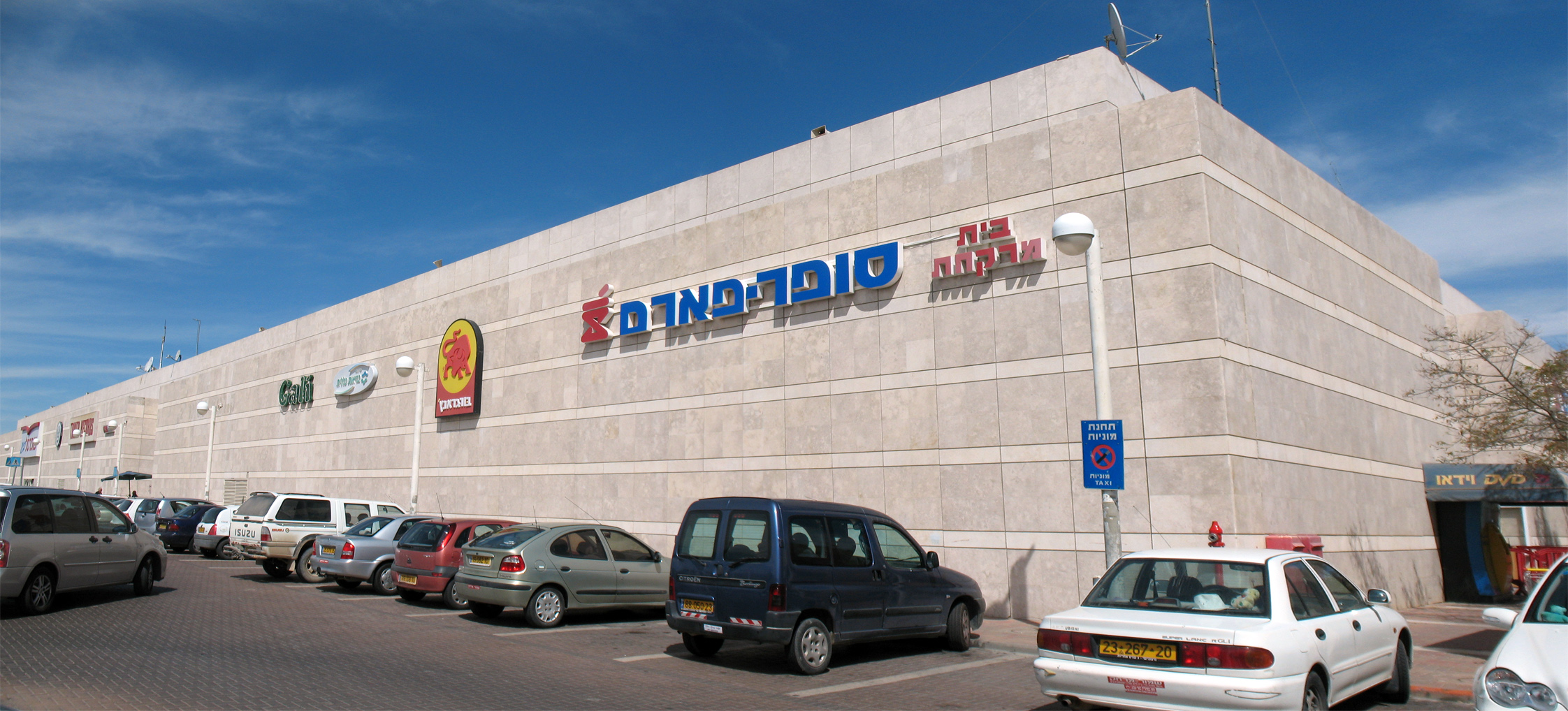
A Super-Pharm in Arad, Israel

- Super-Pharm

== Malaysia ==
- Guardian Pharmacy
- Watsons
- Alpro Pharmacy
- BIG Pharmacy
- Caring Pharmacy
- Sunway Multicare Pharmacy

=== Online pharmacy ===
- DoctorOnCall

== Mexico ==
- Farmacias Benavides
- Farmacias Guadalajara

== Netherlands ==
Pharmacies in the Netherlands are mostly independently owned by pharmacists. In 2011, 31% of all pharmacies were part of one of the following chains:

- Alliance Healthcare
- Dio Drogist
- Mediq

== New Zealand ==
- Unichem
- Life Pharmacy
- Chemist Warehouse

== Norway ==
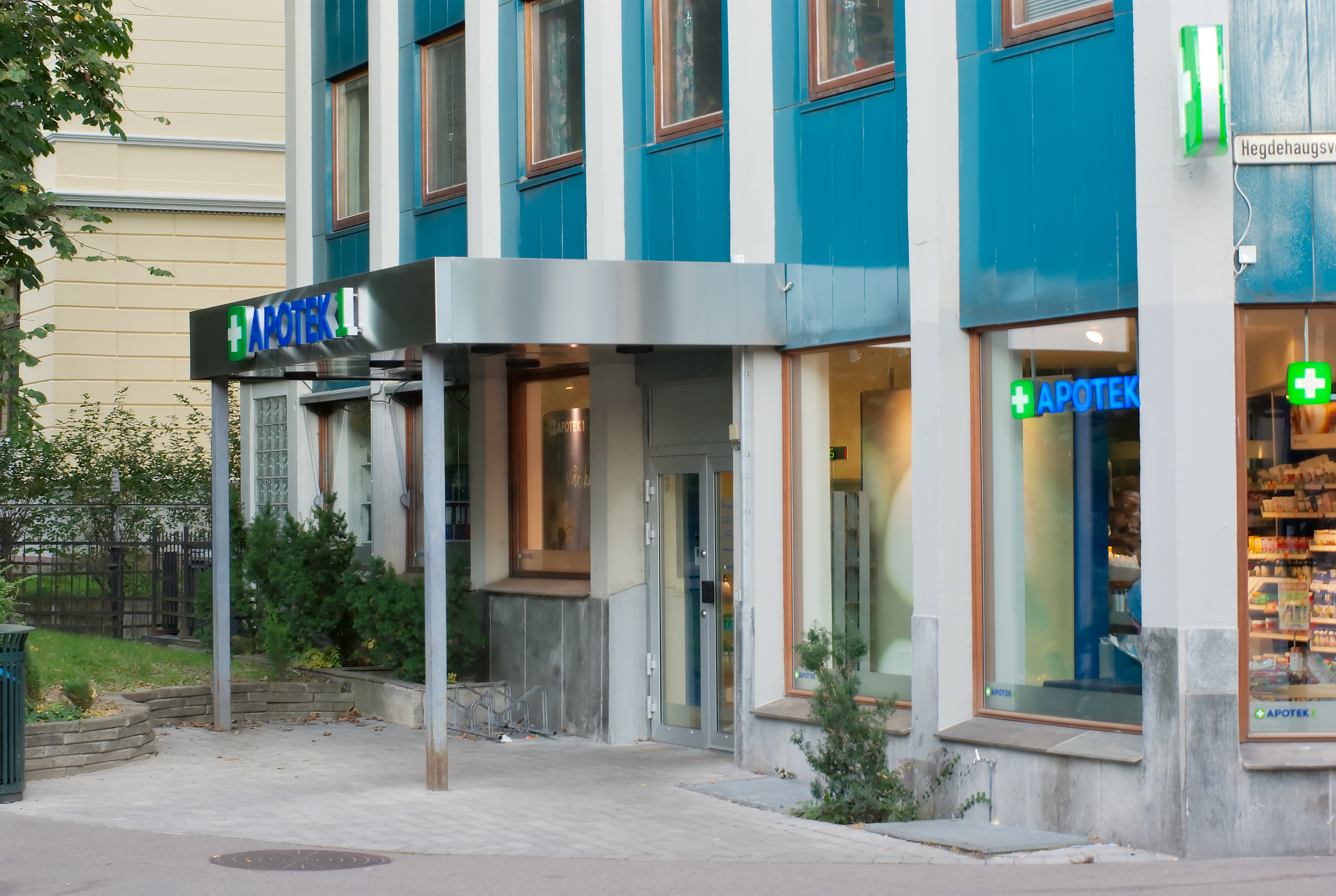
An Apotek 1 pharmacy in Oslo, Norway

- Alliance Boots (opened in 2008 under the name Boots Apotek, using the same logos and products as in the UK)
- Apotek 1
- Central Norway Pharmaceutical Trust
- Ditt Apotek
- Northern Norway Pharmaceutical Trust
- Southern and Eastern Norway Pharmaceutical Trust
- Vitusapotek
- Western Norway Pharmaceutical Trust

== Philippines ==
- Mercury Drug
- Southstar Drug
- The Generics Pharmacy
- Watsons

== Poland ==
- Super-Pharm

== Puerto Rico ==
- CVS
- Walgreens

=== Defunct chains ===
- Farmacias El Amal

== Singapore ==
- Guardian Pharmacy
- Watsons Pharmacy

== Sweden ==
- Apoteket
- Doc Morris

== Switzerland ==
- Pharmacy of the Eastern Vaud Hospitals

== Taiwan ==
- Cosmed
- Great Tree Pharmacy
- Matsumoto Kiyoshi
- MedFirst
- Tomod's
- Wellcare
- Watsons
- Don Don Donki

== Japan ==
- Tomod's
- Matsumoto Kiyoshi

== Thailand ==
- Alliance Boots
- GNC
- Watsons

== United Arab Emirates ==
- Aster DM Healthcare

== United Kingdom ==
- Asda Pharmacy
- Boots Pharmacy
- Morrisons Pharmacy
- Superdrug Pharmacy
- Tesco Pharmacy
- Waitrose Pharmacy
- Well Pharmacy

=== Other pharmacies ===
- Numark – buying group of over 2,000 independently owned pharmacies in the UK

=== Internet pharmacies ===
- Pharmacy2U – online mail-order pharmacy located in the UK

== United States ==
Many pharmacy chains in the United States are owned and operated by regional supermarket brands, or national big-box store brands such as Walmart. These pharmacies are located within their larger chain stores. The three largest free-standing pharmacy chains in the United States are Walgreens, CVS, and Rite Aid.

- Ahold Financial Services (Giant)
- Benzer Pharmacy
- BI-LO
- Cerberus Capital (Albertsons)
- Costco Pharmacies
- CVS Corporation
- Giant Eagle Pharmacy
- Giant Food
- H E B Drug Stores
- Hy-Vee
- Kaiser Permanente
- Kroger Company
- Medicine Shoppe International
- Meijer Groceries
- Omnicare
- Publix Pharmacies
- Rite Aid Corporation
- Safeway
- Sears Holdings Corporation (Kmart)
- Shopko
- Shoprite Supermarkets
- Supervalu
- Target – pharmacies are operated by CVS
- Walgreens
- Walmart
- Wegmans

=== Stand-alone pharmacy chains ===
- Boone Drug
- CVS Pharmacy
- Discount Drug Mart
- Duane Reade (subsidiary of Walgreens since 2010; operates as separate brand name)
- Family Pharmacy
- Good Neighbor Pharmacy
- Hartig Drug
- Health Mart
- Kinney Drugs
- Leader Drug Stores
- Lewis Drug
- Longs Drugs (subsidiary of CVS since 2008)
- Medicine Shoppe Pharmacy
- Navarro Discount Pharmacies (subsidiary of CVS since 2015)
- Rite Aid
- Thrifty White
- Valu-Rite
- Walgreens

=== Defunct chains ===
- Arbor Drugs (acquired by CVS in 1998)
- Bartell Drugs (converted into CVS)
- Big B Drugs (acquired by Revco in 1996; rebranded as CVS in 1997)
- Brooks Pharmacy (acquired by Rite Aid in 2007)
- Cunningham Drug (acquired by Walgreens in 1991)
- Dart Drug (bankrupt in 1990)
- Drug Emporium
- Drug Fair (company liquidated in 2009, assets purchased by Walgreens)
- Eckerd (acquired by Rite Aid in 2007)
- Fay's Drug (purchased by JC Penney and rebranded as Eckerd in 1997)
- Farmacias El Amal
- Fred's (company liquidated in 2019)
- GO Guy (purchased by Pay'n'Save in 1987)
- Genovese Drug Stores (acquired by Eckerd parent JC Penney in 1998; rebranded in 2003)
- Gray Drug (Bought by Rite Aid in 1987)
- Happy Harry's (bought by Walgreens in 2006; rebranded in 2011)
- Hook's Drug Stores (acquired by Revco in 1994)
- Jean Coutu (US stores acquired by Rite Aid in 2004)
- K&B (Acquired by Rite Aid in 1997)
- Kerr Drug (acquired by Walgreens in 2013)
- Lane Drug (purchased by Rite Aid in 1989)
- LaVerdiere's (purchased by Rite Aid in 1994)
- Medi Mart (sold to Walgreens in 1980s)
- Osco Drug (freestanding stores acquired by and converted to CVS in 2006)
- Pay 'n Save (acquired by Thirfty Corp. in 1988, rebranded as PayLess Drug)
- PayLess Drug Stores (purchased by Rite Aid in 1996)
- Peoples Drug (acquired by CVS in 1990; rebranded in 1994)
- Perry Drug Stores (acquired by Rite Aid in 1995)
- Phar-Mor (bankrupt in 2002)
- Revco (bought by CVS in 1997, rebranded in 1998)
- Rexall
- Sav-on (freestanding stores acquired by and converted to CVS in 2006)
- Snyder Drug (acquired by Walgreens in 2003)
- Standard Drug (purchased by CVS in 1993; rebranded in 1994)
- Thrift Drug (purchased by JC Penney and rebranded as Eckerd in 1997)
- Thrifty Drugs (purchased by Rite Aid in 1996)
- Treasury Drug (rebranded as Eckerd in 1997)
- USA Drug (bought by Walgreens in 2012)
- Wellby Super Drug (bought by Rite Aid in 1992)

== Vatican City ==
- Vatican Pharmacy

== See also ==
- History of pharmacy
- List of pharmaceutical companies
