= History of Bismarck, North Dakota =

Bismarck is the capital of the state of North Dakota, the county seat of Burleigh County, and the second most populous city in North Dakota after Fargo. The city was formed in 1872 as "Edwinton" after Edwin Ferry Johnson, a chief engineer for the Northern Pacific Railway company, when the railroad reached the eastern banks of the Missouri River. The name was changed less than one year later, honoring German chancellor Otto von Bismarck, in an effort to attract German immigrants. The discovery of gold in the nearby Black Hills in 1874 was the first real impetus for growth. In 1883, Bismarck became the capital of the Dakota Territory and, in 1889, of the state of North Dakota.

== Mandan Nation ==
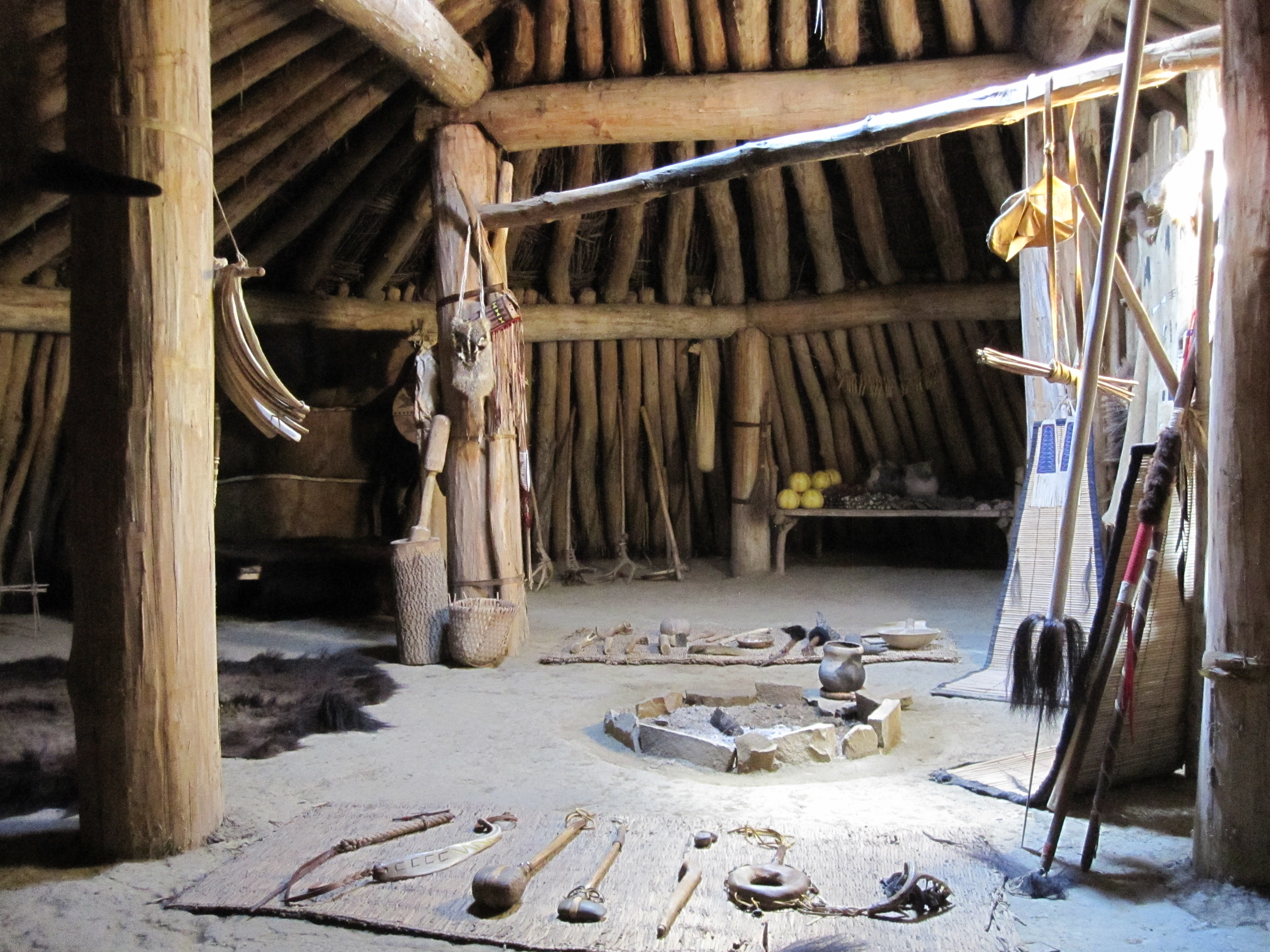
Interior of a reconstructed Mandan home at Fort Abraham Lincoln State Park

The area is known to have been inhabited by Indigenous Americans for thousands of years, but since they left no written documents of themselves, little is known from before European contact. The first well-documented inhabitants of what is now Bismarck were the Mandan Nation. The remains of Chief Looking's Village, one of the Mandan towns, is now a park within the city limits, while another six to eight town sites, including On-a-Slant Village, Large-and-Scattered Village, and Double Ditch Village, made up the homeland of the Mandan Nation from about the mid-1500s to the late 1700s and surround present-day Bismarck for a few miles to the north and south. Their population is estimated to have ranged from about 10,000 to 20,000 during those years. The Mandans had a farming-based culture and lived in earth lodges.

== Bismarck is founded ==
Edwinton was founded in 1872 when the North Pacific Railway reached the eastern banks of the Missouri River. The first buildings constructed were at present-day Camp Hancock, then known as Camp Greeley, which was established as an infantry post and supply depot to ensure expansion of the railroad. The name was changed to “Bismarck” one year later to honor the German chancellor Otto von Bismarck. When Burleigh County was organized in 1873, Bismarck became its county seat. Bismarck quickly erupted with the familiar signs of a prosperous city, with a school, courthouse, hotels, and stores. The Bismarck Tribune published its first edition on July 11, 1873.

The site where Bismarck was established was selected as the point where the Northern Pacific Railroad would cross the Missouri River. Bismarck was known back then for being an outlaw town with no laws and no limits. Bismarck was said to be the place where the beauty of North Dakota begins, and a place of peace and growing success.

== Expansion begins ==
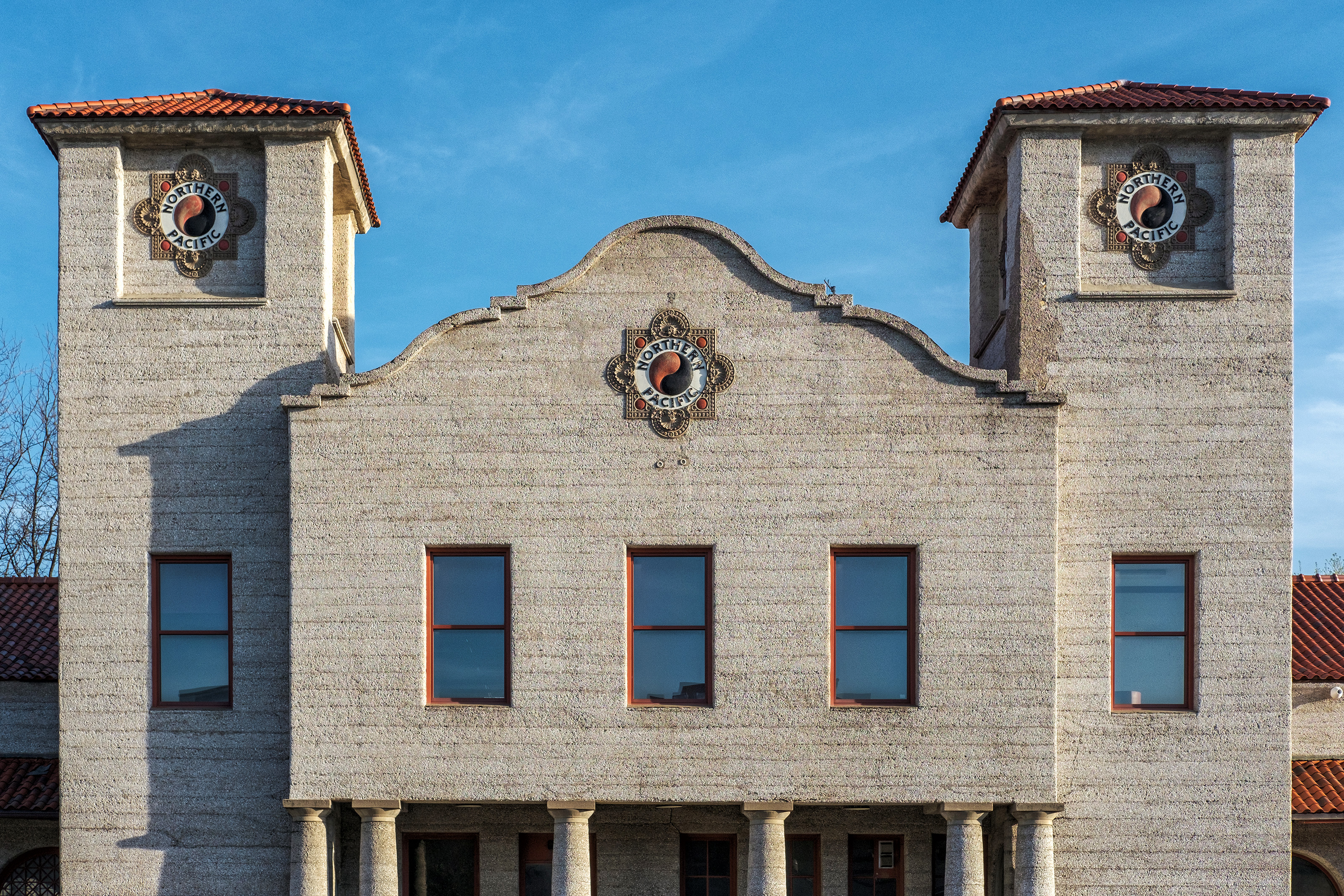
The old Northern Pacific Railway Depot, built in a Mission-Revival style in 1901

The survival of Bismarck was dependent on that of Northern Pacific, which survived bankruptcy and continued the railroad. Upon emerging from bankruptcy, construction immediately commenced on a $1 million bridge to span the Missouri River. The first passenger train crossed the Missouri in 1882, bringing never-ending traffic to the area.

=== Bismarck becomes government ===
The territorial capital of Dakota Territory was moved from Yankton to Bismarck in 1883, putting Bismarck in the national spotlight. Local political boss Alexander McKenzie is credited for achieving the new role for Bismarck. When the Dakota Territory was split into two states, North Dakota and South Dakota, Jamestown, ND was chosen as the new state capital for North Dakota. Some Bismarck citizens raided Jamestown for the state records. After the state records were back in Bismarck, construction of the capital was completed in 1884, and talk of moving the capital city of North Dakota to Jamestown stopped. The first hospital for the Dakota Territory, Saint Alexius, was founded in 1885.

== Turn of the century ==
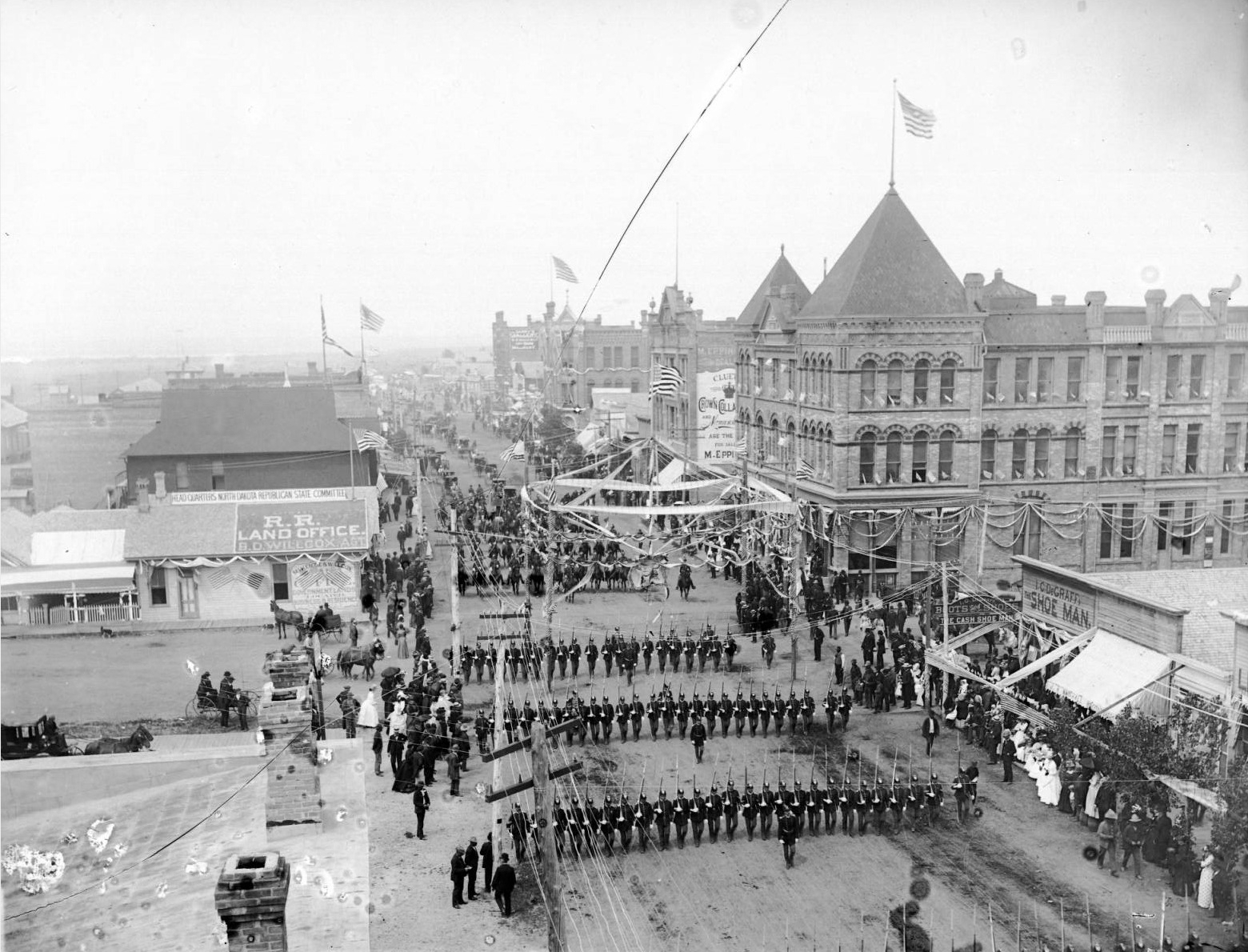
1889 Constitutional Convention parade at Main and 4th streets.

Like most of the country, the 1890s were hard times for North Dakota. The Panic of 1893 was the nation's worst economic hardship to that point, and North Dakota's strong agriculture-based economy was directly affected. To make things worse, Bismarck was struck by a severe fire in August 1898, which destroyed much of the city. On May 14, 1889 the Constitutional Convention was held in Bismarck where the Dakota Territory was admitted into the Union as two states.

=== Rebuilding Bismarck ===
After the 1898 fire, Bismarck was forced to rebuild a large portion of the city, including most of its downtown. Buildings from this point onward were built mostly of brick and concrete, and often advertised as "fireproof". Two large and luxurious hotel complexes were constructed at this time. Hotel McKenzie, later renamed Patterson Hotel, opened on January 1, 1911, followed by Grand Pacific Hotel in 1912. These served as Bismarck's largest hotels for decades. Some U.S. presidents stayed at the famous Patterson Hotel.

==== Grand Pacific Hotel ====
The Grand Pacific Hotel opened in 1912, serving as a direct competitor to the Patterson for decades. The Grand Pacific attracted more of a family audience than the Patterson. Finney's Drug was located on the first floor of the building for most of its tenure. In 1963, Attorney General Robert F. Kennedy addressed the National Congress of American Indians at the hotel.

=== Liberty Memorial Bridge ===
The first vehicular bridge in the region to span the Missouri River was completed in 1922. The Liberty Memorial Bridge completed the coast-to-coast link of U.S. Highway 10, and remained the only vehicular bridge within 500 miles for many years. Within two years of its completion, the bridge was seeing 2,000 vehicles per day.

=== Growth of business ===
Bismarck was continuing to see rapid growth, and attracted most of the nation's largest retailers at the time. The first to arrive was F.W. Woolworth in the late 1910s, followed by Montgomery Ward in 1928 and J.C. Penney the following year. In addition the national chains, local retailers were also thriving. Among the most successful retailers included Webb Brothers Department Store, which first opened in 1884, and A.W. Lucas & Company, which first opened in 1899.

== New state capitol ==
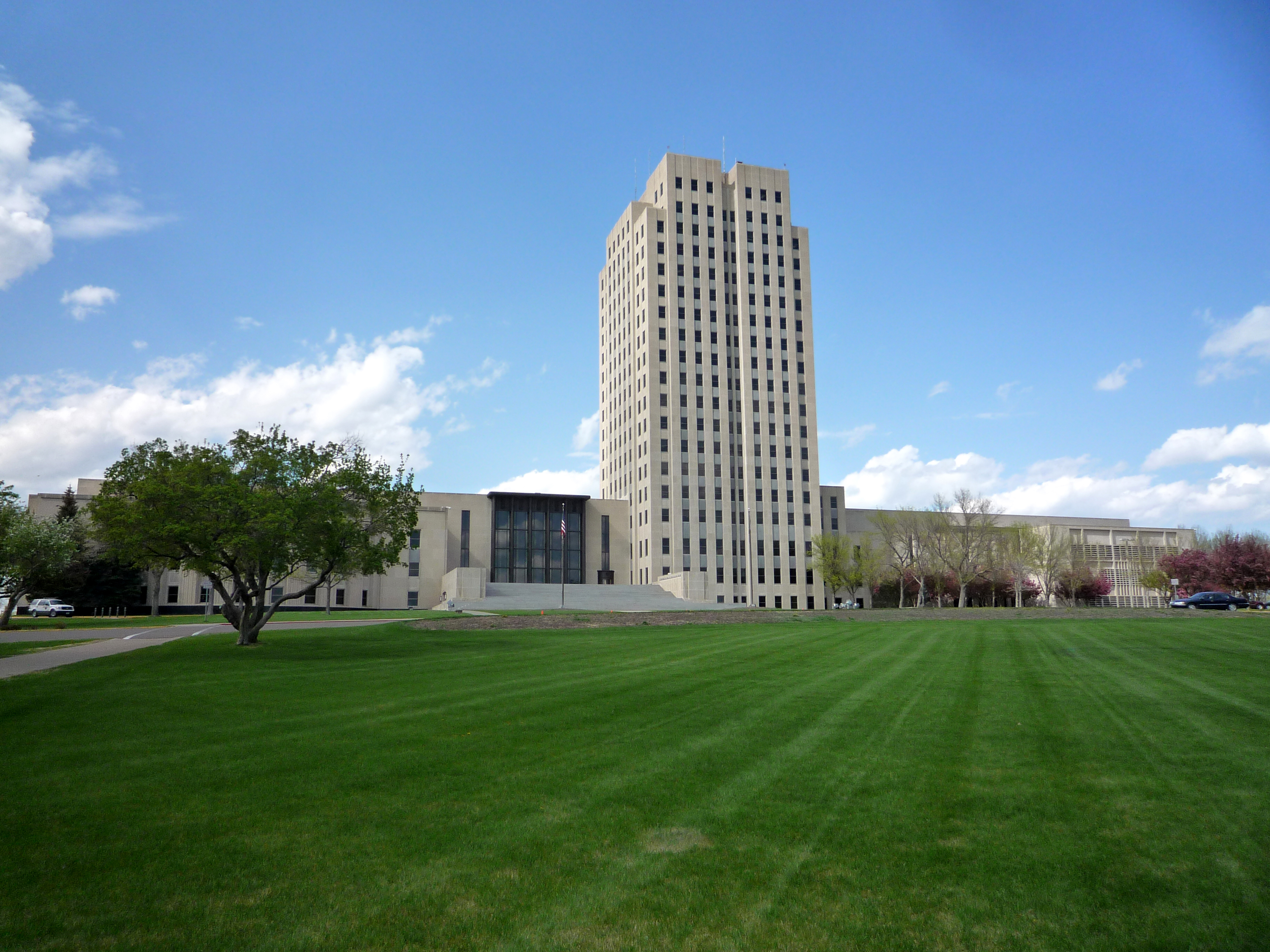
North Dakota State Capitol

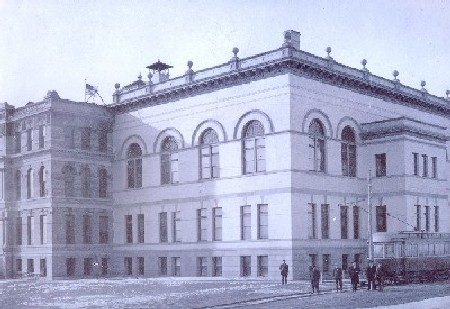
Old North Dakota State Capitol

The state capitol was destroyed by fire on December 28, 1930. The loss totaled $2 million, and North Dakota was faced with constructing a new capitol in the midst of the Great Depression. They chose to construct an art deco skyscraper, which would tower over the city at nineteen stories when completed in 1934. With a simple outside look, and with an expensive, glamorous, design on the inside, it was nicknamed "The Prairie Palace". It was the tallest building in North Dakota for years to come. However, construction of the capitol did not go smoothly.

=== Construction laborers strike ===
Laborers constructing the new capitol went on strike on May 13, 1933. The strike lasted for weeks, and didn't come to an end until the declaration of martial law by Governor William Langer.

=== Governor removed as construction ends ===
The new capitol was completed in 1934, but news of its completion was buried beneath that of the removal of Governor William "Wild Bill" Langer, who was found guilty on two felony convictions. The North Dakota Supreme Court ordered Langer out of office, to be replaced with his Lieutenant Governor Ole Olson. As a response, Langer declared North Dakota's secession from the United States, then called a special legislative session, where he would proclaim "I am still your governor" and asked for the impeachment of Ole Olson and the supreme court justices. Even with intense support, Langer eventually rescinded.

== New high school ==
The 1912 high school building was overflowing with 634 students, forcing Bismarck to construct a new facility. The new Bismarck High School building opened in 1935, and was expected to fulfill the needs of the growing city for many years. In fact, the new building was so large that it also housed Bismarck Junior College from its inception in 1939 until 1955.

=== Fort Lincoln Internment Camp ===
During World War II, Fort Lincoln Internment Camp, located just south of Bismarck, was converted into an internment camp to house German and Japanese civilians and POWs. It was the largest of such camps in the United States. By the time the camp closed in 1946, more than 4,030 prisoners had been detained there. The camp had initially been established as a military post in 1895 to replace Fort Abraham Lincoln located south of Mandan.

== Flood of 1952 ==
On April 6, 1952, the Missouri River crested at 27.9 feet, resulting in the city's worst flood in forty-two years. Nearly everything south of the railroad was underwater. Two hundred homes were destroyed and the Wachter family reported a loss of three hundred cattle. The flood of 1952 remains the largest recent flooding for the city.

=== Garrison Dam ===
The closure of the Garrison Dam occurred in April 1953, one year after the city's major flooding. The dam's completion resulted in the creation of the nation's third largest man-made lake, Lake Sakakawea. For the first time, the city could expand south of the railroad without fears of major flooding. This was facilitated by developers like the Wachter family of Bismarck, a local business-minded family who purchased much of the land south of the tracks before Garrison Dam was created.

== Decay of downtown ==
Bismarck's first shopping center, Arrowhead Plaza, opened in 1954. Northbrook Mall, the city's second, and first fully enclosed shopping center, opened in 1959. Neither mall had much impact on downtown Bismarck, but this marked a changing trend for the shopping patterns of the city.

For decades, downtown Bismarck served as the regional hub for business, but as in most cities, change was around the corner. Interstate 94 was completed in 1965, creating a second vehicular bridge, the Grant Marsh Bridge. The new highway shifted all through traffic to the north, greatly affecting downtown businesses, which were reliant on U.S. Highway 10 (known as Main Avenue through Bismarck).

Kirkwood Mall opened in 1970, forever changing Bismarck's retail trend. Woolworth's and Montgomery Ward were the first major retailers to leave downtown when they anchored Kirkwood. Sears and A.W. Lucas left to anchor Gateway Mall when it opened in 1979. It was also at this time that BEST Products opened its doors in south Bismarck (initially as a "LaBelle's" store until 1982 when BEST acquired LaBelle's parent company, Modern Merchandising, Inc.). J.C. Penney was last of the national department stores to leave downtown Bismarck to anchor Kirkwood's new wing in 1980. Since then, downtown Bismarck has been on a steady downward trend. The Bismarck Downtowner's Association was developed to help support and promote downtown business.

== Discount department stores ==
Kmart was the first discount department store to arrive, in October 1971, and was also one of the first businesses to open north of Interstate 94. Regional discount chain White Mart became an original anchor for Gateway Mall in 1979, but it closed in 1986. Target came with Kirkwood's 1980 expansion, followed by Wal-Mart in 1990.

== Major retailers close ==
Beginning in the early 1980s, Bismarck was hit with a string of long-time business closures. A.W. Lucas closed not long after relocating to Gateway Mall, which was replaced with Herberger's until it too closed in 1994 upon expanding its Kirkwood Mall location. Woolworth's closed in 1985, but was quickly replaced with Dayton's. Gateway Mall took the biggest blow overall, beginning with the closing of White Mart in 1986, followed by the Herberger's closure; the latter was unable to find a stable tenant for nearly ten years. Kirkwood also took a severe blow in 1998 with the closure of Montgomery Ward. Other major retail closures over the years include BEST Products in 1997, and Marshall Field's (formerly Dayton's) in 2005. Although Kirkwood lost Montgomery Ward, their store vacancies only lasted a minimal amount of time. Opening I. Keating's Furniture World and many other specialty shops and restaurants displayed the city's steady business economy.

On October 2, 2018, the former Best Stop C-Store gas station and La Tejana Mexican Market building was abruptly demolished. The owner of the building has plans to replace it with a new apartment. Best Stop C-Store closed in 2012 allegedly due to insufficient business. It was formerly a Kroger-brand Mini-Mart, which had closed once prior to re-opening as Best Stop. The awning which was previously used for the gas pumps was torn down. After this, Ruth Meiers, a local homeless shelter, tried to turn the building into a soup kitchen, but was denied due to strong neighborhood opposition. La Tejana Mexican Market moved in during 2014, and stayed until August 2018.

== Severe weather hits the region ==
The start of the new millennium brought some of the worst storms ever recorded in the region. Just three years earlier, the worst winter storm since March 1966 had buried the region in seventeen inches of snow. The resulting 1996-1997 winter season currently holds the record for the most snowfall recorded.

On November 1, 2000, a series of tornadoes touched down in and around the city, but caused only limited damage.

=== 2001 hailstorm ===
On June 9, 2001, Bismarck was hit with a severe hailstorm that caused millions of dollars in damage. Nearly every structure in the city reported damage. In addition to the hail, reported up to baseball size (1.5 inches), 1.85 inches of rain officially fell at the airport, coupled with winds topping 50MPH. The storm resulted in the most insurance claims ever filed in the state of North Dakota - even more than in the Grand Forks Flood of 1997.

=== 2008–2009 winter season ===
The winter season of 2008–2009 was one of the worst ever recorded in the city, breaking numerous records. December 2008 recorded more snow than any other single month, and the season itself ended in second place for most snowfall, only 1.4 inches from the all-time record of 1996–1997. Bismarck also recorded a temperature of -44 °F, the coldest temperature since 1950, and only one degree from the all-time coldest temperature recorded in the city.

=== 2009 floods ===
The record snowfall and low temperatures resulted in the most severe spring flooding since 1952. To help reduce the flood levels, waterflow at the Garrison Dam was completely shut off the first time in its history. The flooding, like those in the past, was caused mostly by ice jams in the Missouri River. A specialized team of demolition experts was brought out to break up the ice and reduce the water levels. The flooding evacuated 1700 citizens in or near the Fox Island and South Port. Much of south Bismarck or south of Bismarck Expressway was flooded or flooding. A similar occurrence also happened in 2011.

== People ==
- John Moses
