= Revieve (company) =

Software-as-a-service company in Finland

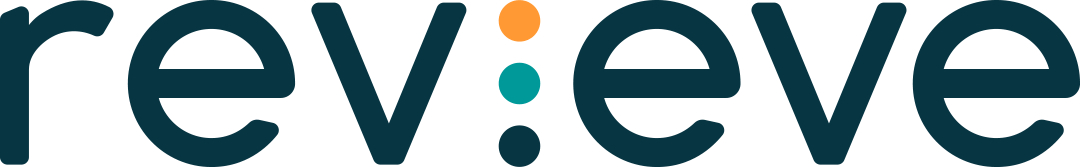
- Company type: Private
- Industry: Technology, beauty
- Founded: 2016
- Headquarters: Helsinki, Finland
- Key people: Sampo Parkkinen (co-founder, CEO); Gavin Weigh (co-founder, COO); Samuli Siivinen (co-founder, CTO)
- Website: revieve.com

Revieve is a Software-as-a-Service company that develops artificial intelligence (AI) and augmented reality solutions for the beauty and wellness industry.

== History and background ==
Revieve was founded in 2016 by Gavin Weigh, Sampo Parkkinen, and Samuli Siivinen. It was initially launched with its AI Skincare Advisor.

In 2021, Revieve expanded its global presence through partnerships in more than 40 countries, including collaborations with Yon-Ka (North America, France), Boots (UK) Edgewell Bulldog Skincare (North America), AS Watson (UK, Netherlands), SKIN FIRST (Italy), Babor (Germany), Garancia (France), Faces (Middle East), Myntra (India), Shiseido (EMEA region), and Boost Lab (Australia). In the same year, the company introduced the Revieve Skin Coach, a platform for skincare routines, and the AI Makeup Advisor, which provided digital makeup experiences and virtual try-on and full-look recommendations.

In 2022, Revieve and Shiseido launched an AI-powered makeup advisor that used facial feature analysis to offer a virtual makeup experience, allowing users to visualize different makeup looks in real time. The company partnered with the Swedish cosmetic company Kicks to provide its AI-powered advisor services in the same year. By 2024, Revieve had included MatsukiyoCocokara (Japan), Dr’s Secret (Singapore), Marionnaud (Switzerland), JC Penny Beauty (USA), and Super-Pharm (Israel) as its partners.

In 2023, Revieve launched a beauty technology platform on Google Cloud Marketplace, providing AI-powered tools for skincare and makeup. The company also announced a global strategic partnership with Google Cloud to integrate generative AI and data analytics into its services.

In 2024, Revieve introduced the Next Gen AI Advisor series, a set of generative AI tools for skincare, makeup, and haircare, built on Google Cloud’s Vertex AI platform. The company also released its first generative AI solution specifically for the beauty industry, enabling automated, data-driven beauty consultations. Revieve inked partnerships with RoC Skincare (France, US) and Barefaced (US) to support RoC AI Skin Insight Tool and Barefaced AI Skin Coach in the same year.

Revieve provides AI-driven enterprise solutions that analyze user characteristics and preferences to generate recommendations. The AI Skincare Advisor evaluates skin conditions to create personalized skin care routines, while the AI Makeup Advisor utilizes facial feature analysis to provide makeup suggestions and virtual try-ons. The AI Haircare Advisor evaluates hair types and concerns to develop personalized haircare routines, and the AI Hair Color Artist enables real-time visualization of different hair colors. These solutions are integrated into e-commerce platforms, mobile applications, and in-store experiences.

According to company officials, it follows ethical AI practices, offering transparency in its AI design. Revieve also supports sustainability initiatives by providing tools to assist consumers. In 2024, the company received the Beauty Innovation of the Year Award from The Independent Innovation Awards and the Best Technology Solution Provider Award from the BeautyMatter NEXT Awards. Revieve is also the recipient of the Collaboration Award from the Industry.beauty Awards.

As of 2025, the company is headquartered in Helsinki, Finland, with offices in Chicago, Valencia, and Seoul. Revieve has been serving customers worldwide across North America, Latin America, Europe, the Middle East, and the Asia-Pacific region.

== Products and services ==
Revieve offers different digital solutions to assist consumer experiences in the beauty and wellness sectors. Its platform uses advanced technologies to provide personalized services across different product categories. These include AI-powered tools for skincare, makeup, haircare, sun protection, and nutrition.

The AI Skincare Advisor and AI Skincare Advisor Pro offer personalized skincare diagnostics and product recommendations based on skin analysis. The AI Makeup Advisor, AI Makeup Artist, and AI Foundation Finder use facial analysis and real-time visualization to recommend makeup products. The AI Hair Care Advisor and AI Hair Color Artist offer personalized haircare routines and help visualize hair color transformations. The AI Suncare Finder recommends sun protection products based on individual needs, and the Nutrition Advisor provides AI-driven suggestions for nutrition and supplements.

Revieve's platform also incorporates technologies like Generative AI for hyper-personalization and predictive analytics, Shop by Inspiration tools such as Match My Look and Shop the Look, and Consumer Intent Discovery, adapting consumer preferences and recommendations. The platform integrates Beauty Fusion, which combines personalized beauty inspiration with interactive features, and extends personalization to beauty-related nutrition and supplements.
