= Daniel Boone Hotel =

Daniel Boone Hotel may refer to:

- Daniel Boone Hotel (Boone, North Carolina), listed on the NRHP in North Carolina
- Daniel Boone Hotel (Charleston, West Virginia), listed on the NRHP in West Virginia
