= Cadieu =

Cadieu is a French surname. Notable people with the surname include:

- Bert Cadieu (1903–1990), Canadian politician
- Jean-Marie Cadieu (born 1963), French rugby union player
- Trevor Cadieu, Canadian military officer

== See also ==
- Cadieux
