= Hammer Pharmacy =

Hammer Pharmacy is Iowa's oldest pharmacy. It was founded in 1872 by Alvin G. Hammer (a German immigrant born in 1855), doing business as Hammer Drug, on the corner of East Grand Avenue and East 6th Street in what is now known as the East Village of Des Moines, Iowa.

Russell E. Johnson, Sr., R.Ph. started working for Hammer in 1918 at the age of 13, became a partner in 1942, and purchased the business in 1945. Russ Johnson Sr. worked at Hammer Pharmacy for years until he died in 1988 at the age of 82. Russell E. Johnson, Jr., R.Ph. followed in his father's footsteps and started working for Hammer Pharmacy at the age of 11 in 1941. He began work as a Pharmacist when he completed school in 1952 and became a manager of the store in 1954. He currently is a major stockholder of the company.

Since its founding, Hammer Pharmacy has remained an independent pharmacy and is one of the few remaining such pharmacies in Des Moines today. It is affiliated with Hammer Medical Supply, a family of nine durable medical equipment stores located in Iowa.
