= EBOS =

EBOS may refer to:

- EBOS Group, an Australasian marketer, wholesaler, and distributor of medical, and pharmaceutical products
- Ostend–Bruges International Airport (ICAO airport code: EBOS)
- eBOS, a network that is used internally by McDonald's for their equipment.
