= Jesse Lewis =

Jesse Lewis may refer to:

- Jesse Lewis, American businessman, co-founder of Lewis Drug
- Jesse Lewis IV, American model and actor on America's Most Smartest Model , Sistas (TV series), Florida Man (TV series)
- Jesse Lewis, journalist, Managing Editor of The Wall Street Journal Europe
- Jesse Lewis (2006–2012), Sandy Hook Elementary School shooting victim; namesake of the Jesse Lewis Choose Love Movement
- Jesse Lewis, Japanese idol, Member of boy band SixTONES

== See also ==
- Jesse Lewisohn (1872–1918), American financier
- Jessie Penn-Lewis (1861–1927), Welsh evangelical speaker
