= Pharmasave =

Canadian pharmacy and drugstore chain

Pharmasave Drugs (National) Ltd.
- Industry: Pharmacy, retail
- Founded: 1981; 45 years ago
- Headquarters: Langley, British Columbia
- Products: Drugs, healthcare products
- Website: pharmasave.com

Pharmasave is a Canadian independent pharmacy and drugstore retailer with over 800 stores across Canada. Pharmasave produces a line of over 700 private-label Pharmasave Brand products.

== History ==
Pharmasave was created in September 1981 through the merger of two British Columbia-based pharmacy chains, United Pharmacy and Western Drug Mart.

== Locations ==
Pharmasave's national office is located in Langley, British Columbia. Its stores are located in nine provinces and territories across Canada and are organized into 2 regions with each region having their own regional offices: West (British Columbia, Alberta, Saskatchewan, Manitoba, and Yukon), and East (Ontario, Newfoundland and Labrador, New Brunswick, Nova Scotia, and Prince Edward Island). The largest Pharmasave is located in Port Hope, Ontario.

== Management ==
Each of Pharmasave's stores operates independently and they range in size from small dispensaries to large-format home healthcare pharmacies. Each region has a Board of Directors as well as representation on the national Board of Directors. Pharmasave's business model is one of self-governance, where pharmacy owners are elected to serve on its regional Boards of Directors. This way, the needs of the owners are served by other owners, and not by a separate corporate entity. The success of this model has played an important part in the attracting of new members and its growing store count across the country.

== See also ==
- List of Canadian pharmacies
