= Gateway Fashion Mall =

Shopping mall in North Dakota, US

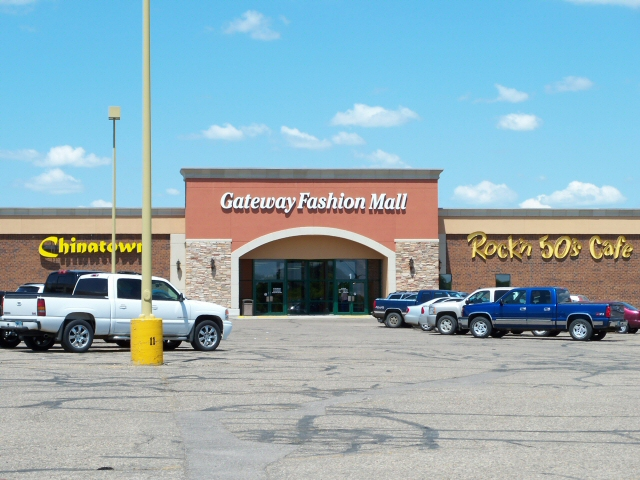
- Location: Bismarck, North Dakota, United States
- Coordinates: 46°50′10″N 100°46′37″W
- Opened: 1979
- Num. of stores: 30+
- Num. of anchor tenants: 7 (5 open, 2 vacant)
- Floor area: 320,000 square feet (30,000 m^{2})
- Floors: 1
- Public transit: Bis-Man Transit
- Website: gatewaymallbismarck.com

Gateway Fashion Mall (formerly Gateway Mall) is an enclosed shopping mall in Bismarck, North Dakota. Opened in 1979, the mall has more than 30 stores. The anchor stores are Harbor Freight Tools, Jo-Ann Fabrics, Planet Fitness and Mid Dakota Clinic. There are 2 vacant anchor stores that were once Sears and Conlin's Furniture. The mall's AMC Theatres location closed its door at the height of the COVID-19 pandemic and has since been replaced by a church.

== History ==
Previous to a mall, the area was occupied by the town dump.

The mall was opened in September 1979 with anchor stores Sears, A.W. Lucas & Co., and White Mart. The mall originally featured a three-screen movie theater and food court to complement the three anchor stores and several in-line tenants.

Desmond's operated a 7,000-square-foot store from 1980 through 1986.

Thrifty White began closing its White Mart operations in the late 1980s; the store at Gateway Mall was taken by Menards, a Wisconsin-based home improvement chain. Menards have re-located outside the mall. Part of the space was leased by the PrimeCare Health Network, while the remainder of the former White Mart/Menards was converted to Hancock Fabrics, now Planet Fitness.

The middle anchor of the three original was A.W. Lucas. Their closure made way for Herberger's, which closed in 1994. The space, which later became Jacob's, then World's Greatest Deals, was taken by Conlin's Furniture.

Other stores in the 1990s included teen fashion merchant Deb, Payless Shoes, Juniques (gifts and collectables), and House of Sund pet store. Weight Watchers held meetings at the mall during the late 80s/90s. For a brief period in the early 2000s, Gateway Mall was home to a second Bath and Body Works location as well as Prairie Peddler, a home and gift store.

The mall's theaters were expanded to the "Midco 8", and at the time of expansion the complex was the largest in the city.

For many years, the Gateway to Science Center had a location inside the center of the mall. This hands-on museum allowed visitors to try science-related activities and experiments. The Gateway to Science Center has moved to a new building close to Bismarck State College.

In 2006, Osco Drug, was converted to CVS/Pharmacy.

On July 23, 2016, Antiques on Main, a local antique store, opened a second store inside the mall filling the space of a leased dance studio.

Not Too Shabby, an 8,000 square foot antiques opened in 2014. In 2017 the vintage merchandiser retired. The empty space was filled by BismanGuns and Bret Ruff Auctions, a firearm store and auction service.

In 2011, Classic Design, a vintage merchandise/furniture store, relocated from downtown Bismarck. In mid-late 2017, Classic Design announced it would be closing after over 20 years in business in Bismarck (six of which were in the mall).

== Gateway Mall today ==
Since January, 2003, the mall has been sold three times. On May 10, 2006, it was announced that the center was purchased by Raymond Arjmand, of Encino, California at a purchase price of $13.25 million. It celebrated a re-opening on November 18, 2006, and is now known as "Gateway Fashion Mall". Arjmand has completed a $10 million renovation to the mall. Macy's was mentioned as an additional anchor store in 2006, but never came to fruition. A two-story addition including a vaulted atrium and space for up to six new stores was planned, but also never came to fruition.

=== Major tenants vacate ===
In 2008, CVS/pharmacy announced they were leaving Gateway Mall upon constructing their own freestanding store. On June 26, 2009, Conlin's Furniture and Joy's Hallmark announced intentions to vacate the mall. This marks the fourth anchor store to depart from the space occupied by Conlin's Furniture in the mall's thirty-year existence. Joy's Hallmark had been a tenant at the mall for over twenty years.

On July 27, 2016, Hancock Fabrics closed after filing Chapter 11 Bankruptcy which left Sears as the only anchor left.

On January 4, 2018, it was announced that Sears would be closing as part of a plan to close 103 stores nationwide. The store closed in April 2018. The closure of Sears left the mall with no anchors left. In February 2018, Planet Fitness announced it was planning to move into the former Hancock Fabrics space.

At the start of June 2020, AMC Theatres closed its doors due to the COVID-19 pandemic leaving the locally owned Grand 22 as the only theater in Bismarck. The location is now a church.
