= Daniel Boone Hotel (Boone, North Carolina) =

Historic hotel in North Carolina, US

- U.S. National Register of Historic Places
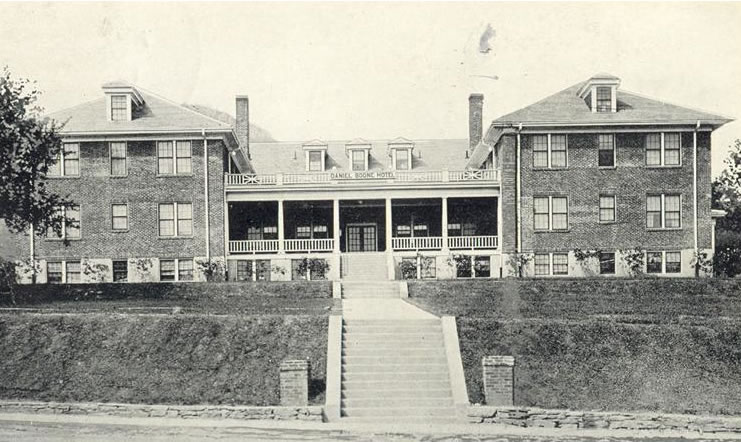
- Daniel Boone Hotel

- Location within North Carolina Location within the United States
- Location: E. King St., Boone, North Carolina
- Coordinates: 36°13′6″N 81°40′57″W
- Area: 1 acre (0.40 ha)
- Built: 1925
- NRHP reference No.: 82001307
- Added to NRHP: December 27, 1982

The Daniel Boone Hotel was a hotel and dining facility located in downtown Boone, Watauga County, North Carolina.

== Construction ==
The building, constructed in 1925, was of a joisted masonry construction consisting of two stories with Colonial Revival detailing. The main entrance included a long terraced walkway beginning from the West King Street sidewalk leading to an entrance veranda. The building itself sat upon 10 acres (4.0 ha).

== History ==
A group of Boone business leaders realized a need for a hotel to accommodate tourists, traveling salesmen, visiting court officials, and new faculty at Appalachian State Normal School. The group of leaders included G.P. Hagaman, R.C. Rivers, F.A. Linney, and W.H. Gragg. They incorporated the Daniel Boone Hotel Company and issued 500 shares at a par value of $100 per share in order to begin construction.

Crossing the front porch, hotel guests entered into a spacious lobby with a grand staircase and two large fireplaces on both sides. The dining room was situated on the left side, and on the right side of the basement ground level there was a covered pull through for cars- a horseshoe shaped drive looped around back the hotel from the street. Employees attending Appalachian State roomed on the third floor, and the hotel manager had an apartment behind the front desk.

Construction completed in 1925, the Great Depression caused the hotel to become bankrupt, and in 1935 the hotel was auctioned. The new owners were Joe B. McCoy and Rich Finley. As a partnership they managed the hotel for over forty years. Once the depression was over and the war-time economy guaranteed growth, the hotel became for many years the place to stay in town. Sunday dinner open to the public was a legendary feast, as some residents recall, at $2.00 per person in 1946.

The decline of the hotel began as roadside motels popped up around the Boone area. The hotel closed its doors in the late 1970s. When the remaining proprietor Joe B. McCoy died, his heir sold the property to the Daniel Boone Condominium Company.

Before being demolished it was submitted and listed on the National Register of Historic Places in 1982.

== Remnants ==
- The sign that was displayed on the lawn of the hotel is now located inside Boone Drug on West King Street.
- The ornamental columns that supported the veranda entrance were used in the construction of a chapel at the Watauga Medical Center in Boone.
