= Family Pharmacy =

Family Pharmacy is a network of 2,100 independently owned and operated pharmacies. AmerisourceBergen owns the servicemark Family Pharmacy. AmerisourceBergen also supplies Good Neighbor Pharmacy, a similar but distinct network. It can be considered a retailers' cooperative.

== Concept ==
Family Pharmacy concept encompasses the management of medications at home, often involving collaborative healthcare models to ensure safe, effective, and patient-centered drug use.

Family Pharmacy is a home-based medication storage system, historically rooted in self-care traditions (e.g., 16th-century French pharmacopeias), now shaped by modern healthcare systems.

Key risks include expired medicine (91% of antiseptics in French homes), inappropriate storage (66% in unsecured locations), and self-medication errors (e.g., 17% of French households with medications accessible to children).
