= Conlin's Furniture =

US furniture store chain

Coordinates: 45.46910°N 98.49850°W

- Company type: Private
- Founded: 1937; 89 years ago in Williston, North Dakota
- Founder: Edward Conlin
- Headquarters: Billings, Montana
- Number of locations: 16 (2022)
- Area served: North Dakota, South Dakota, Montana, Wyoming, and Minnesota
- Key people: Lollie Ray, CEO
- Products: Retail - Furniture
- Website: www.conlins.com

Conlin's Furniture is a regional furniture chain of 16 stores, located in five US states. The chain has stores in North and South Dakota, Montana, Wyoming, and Minnesota. Conlin's is headquartered in Billings, Montana, and its main distribution center is located in Bismarck, North Dakota. The company's CEO is Lollie Ray.

== History ==
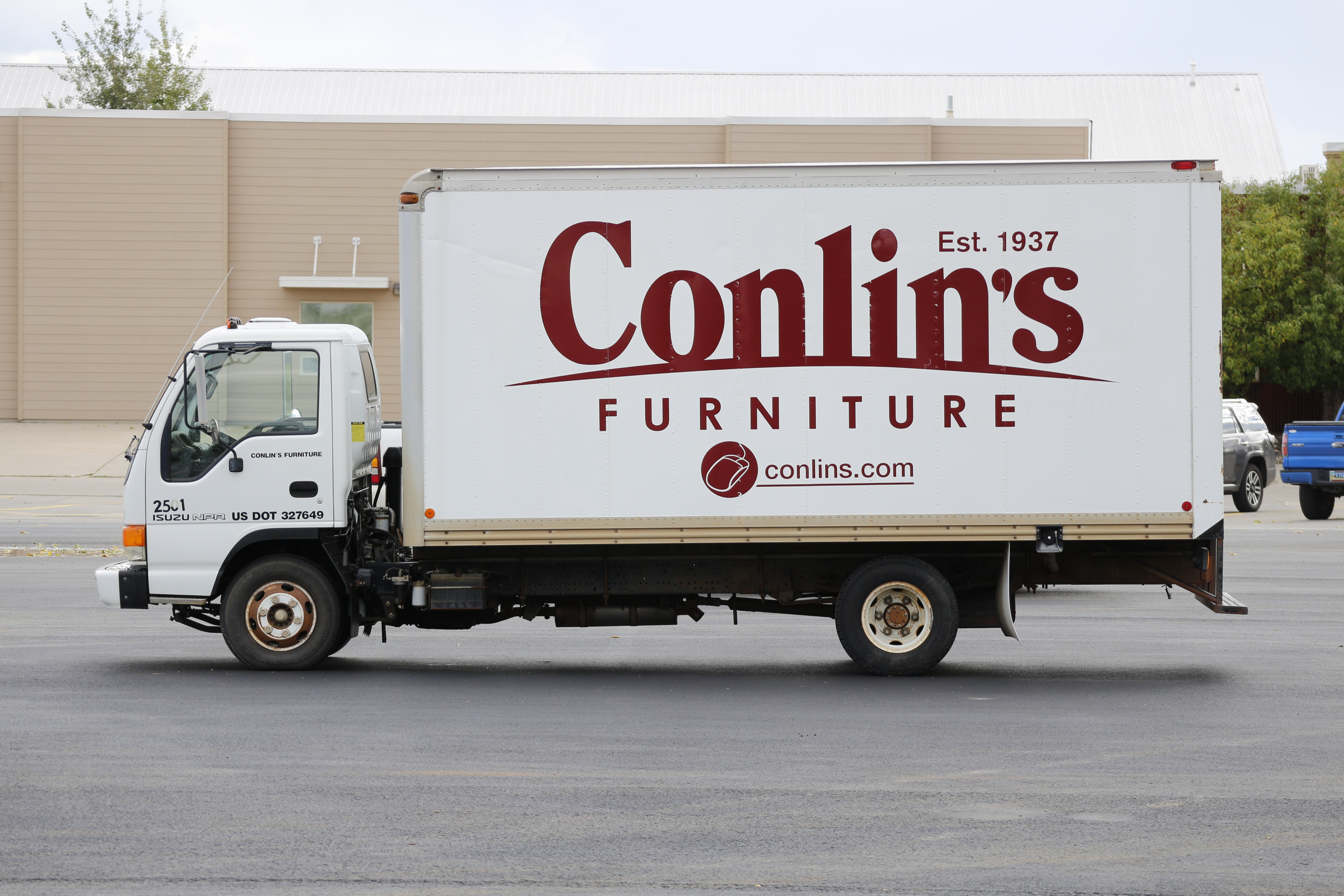
A Conlin's Furniture branded Isuzu NPR truck in Gillette, Wyoming

The first Conlin's Furniture store opened in Williston, North Dakota, in 1937. Shortly thereafter, company co-founder Edward Conlin purchased all shares of the company and began expanding.

In 2004, the company opened a new store in the Gateway Fashion Mall in Bismarck, North Dakota, bringing the total number of Conlin stores to 18.

During the 2008 Great Recession, Conlin's closed its Sioux Falls store, citing "reduced customer traffic" and reducing the total number of stores to 16, located in South Dakota, North Dakota, Minnesota, Montana and Wyoming.

== Selection ==
As do most furniture stores, a typical Conlin's store offers furniture from all room groups, including living room, bedroom, and dining room. Conlin's features a wide array of national brands, including La-Z-Boy, Broyhill, Sealy, Simmons, and A-America.
