= Tomod's =

Japanese drugstore chain

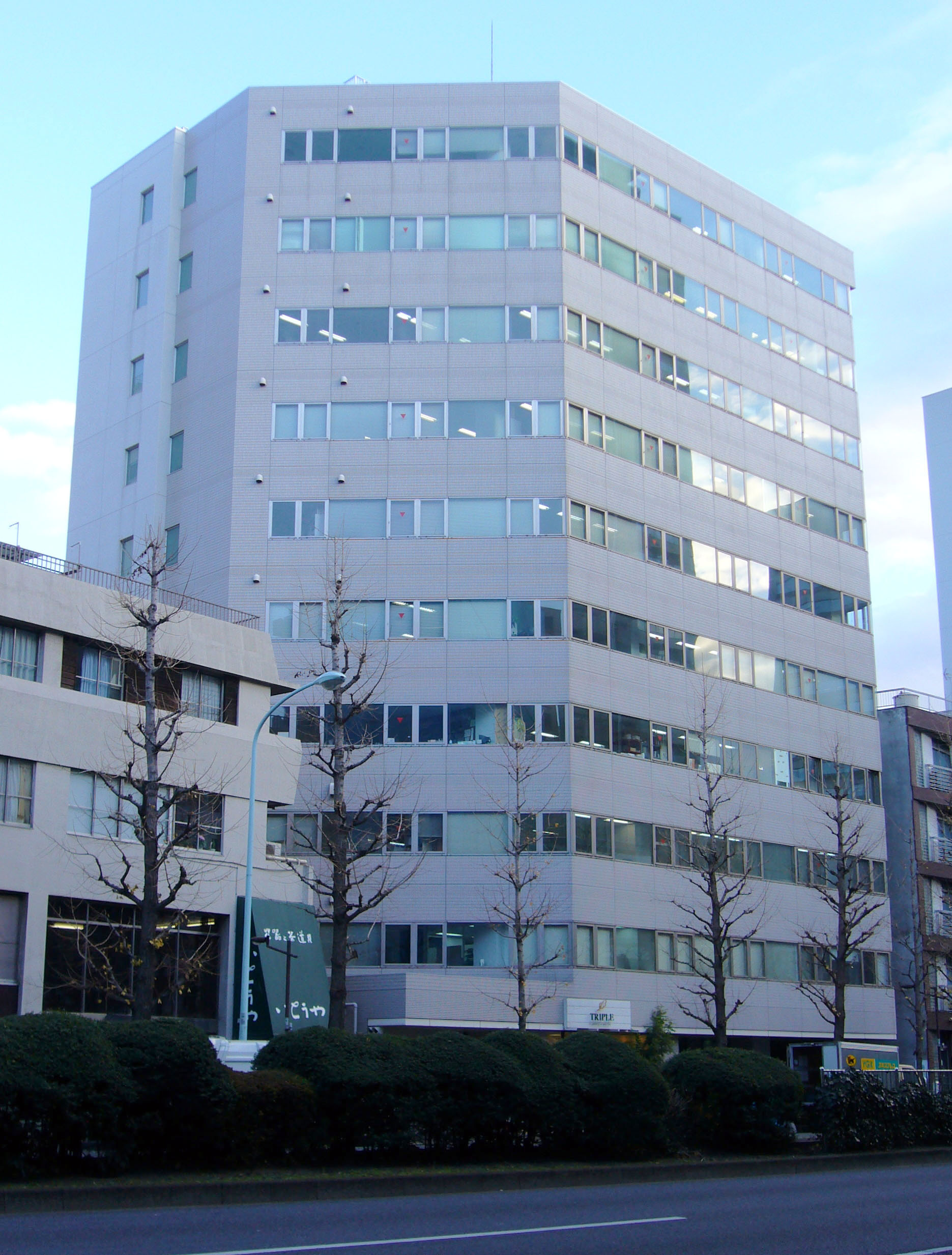
KDX Kasuga Building, headquarters of Tomod's

Tomod's Inc. (株式会社トモズ, Kabushiki Kaisha Tomozu), doing business as Tomod's (トモズ, Tomozu), is a Japanese drugstore chain headquartered on the third floor of the KDX Kasuga Building (KDX春日ビル, KDX Kasuga Biru) in Nishikata (Tokyo), Bunkyō, Tokyo. Tomod's sells cosmetics and other products. Tomod's is a Sumitomo group company, originally established in September 1993.

As of March 2024, they have 275 stores located around Japan, mainly concentrated in the Tokyo metropolitan area. 209 stores accept prescriptions and 108 specially function as pharmaceutical dispensaries.
