= Benzer Pharmacy =

Pharmacy chain in the United States

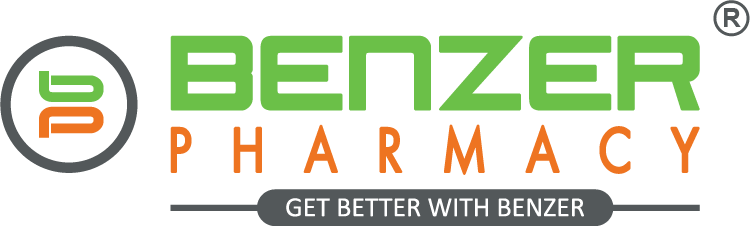
- Type: Private
- Industry: Pharmacy
- Founded: 2009
- Founder: Alpesh Patel
- Headquarters: Tampa, Florida, United States
- Number of locations: 123 stores (2019)
- Area served: Nationwide
- Key people: Alpesh Patel, President
- Website: benzerpharmacy.com

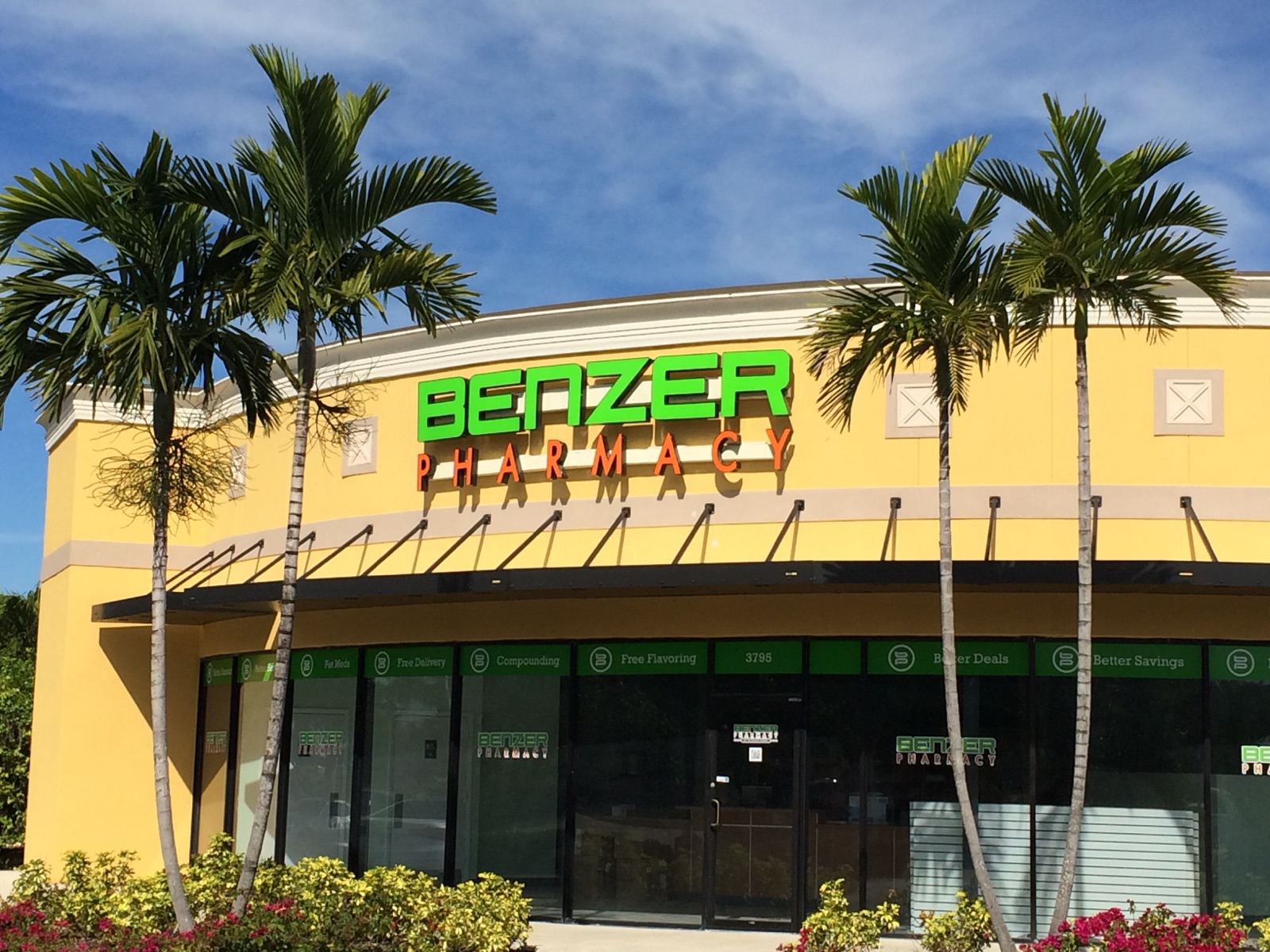
Benzer Pharmacy store in Naples, Florida

Benzer Pharmacy, formerly known as Rx Care Pharmacy, is an independent pharmacy chain in the United States with 85 owned stores and 38 franchised stores. Headquartered in Tampa, Florida, the retail pharmacy ranked in position 1500 in the 2015 Inc. 5000 for the fastest-growing private company in America and position 39 out of 100 in the 2015 Florida Fast 100 for the fastest-growing private companies in Florida.

Benzer Pharmacy sells prescription drugs and over-the-counter drugs. The pharmacy also serves patients and physicians in all 50 states through its online refill services. It specializes in compounding, and also focuses on medication management programs for people with complex chronic diseases, including hepatitis, HIV, Multiple sclerosis (MS), Rheumatoid Arthritis (RA), Hepatitis C, Dermatology and Intravenous immunoglobulin (IVIG).

== Locations ==
The first Benzer Pharmacy was opened in 2009 in Michigan. There are locations in Florida, Virginia, North Carolina, California, Arkansas, Alabama, Iowa, Oklahoma, Nevada, Tennessee, Texas, Colorado, Ohio Georgia, Nevada, and Louisiana.
