= DoctorOnCall =

- Original authors: Maran Virumandi and Hazwan Najib
- Release: May 2016
- Website: www.doctoroncall.com

DoctorOnCall is a Malaysian telehealth provider and online pharmacy. It provides virtual medical consultations through phone calls, video conferences, and text messaging. It could issue medical prescriptions when necessary, following the consultation. Additionally, it offers access to board-certified doctors for non-emergency and non-life-threatening medical issues.

DoctorOnCall was established in 2016 by former management consultants Maran Virumandi and Hazwan Najib. It also provides a medication delivery service in Malaysia, Singapore, and Indonesia including same-day delivery in areas such as the Klang Valley and Penang island.

== Types of on-call services ==
Pharmacy care on-call: General practitioners provide medical services outside regular working hours to address non-emergency cases.

== See also ==
- Emergency medicine
- Telehealth
- Primary care
