= Drogisten Associatie =

Dutch chemist chain

- Trade name: DA
- Formerly: Dienende Actie (untl 1947)
- Founded: 1942, Rotterdam, Netherlands

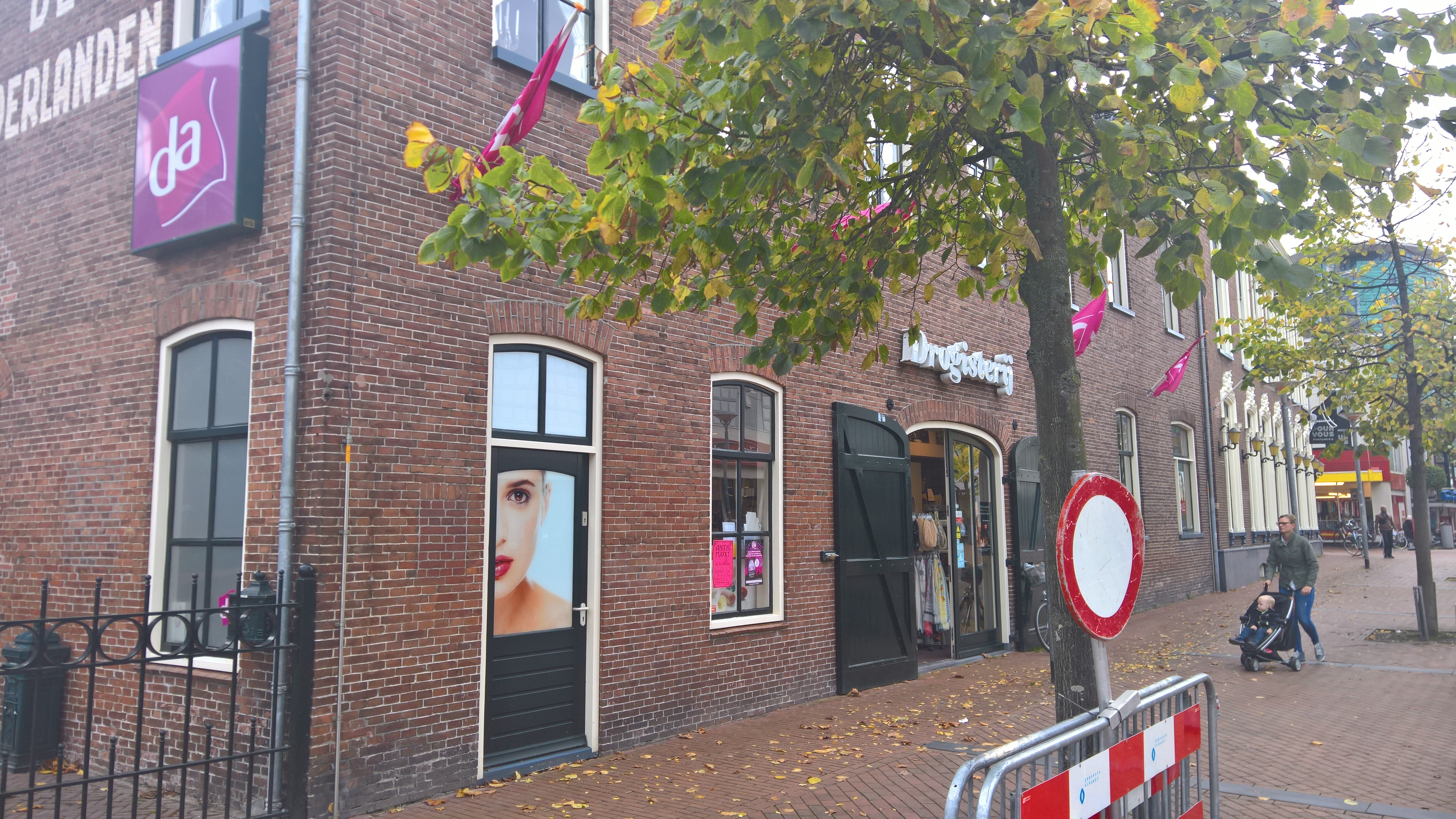
DA drugstore in Winschoten.

DA (styled da, backronym for Drogisten Associatie – drugstore association) is a chain of drugstores in the Netherlands.

== History ==
DA, representing Dienende Actie, was founded in 1942 by five drugstores in Rotterdam. In 1947 the meaning of DA was officially changed to Drogisten Associatie.

On 29 December 2015, DA went bankrupt. The chain immediately continued as a unit of Mosadex. In September 2019, Mosadex acquired the DIO drugstores and re-branded these as DA stores. DIO (short for Drogisten Inkoop Organisatie – drugstore procurement organization) operated over 170 outlets in Dutch towns.
