= Matsumoto Kiyoshi =

Japanese drug store chain

Matsumotokiyoshi Co., Ltd.

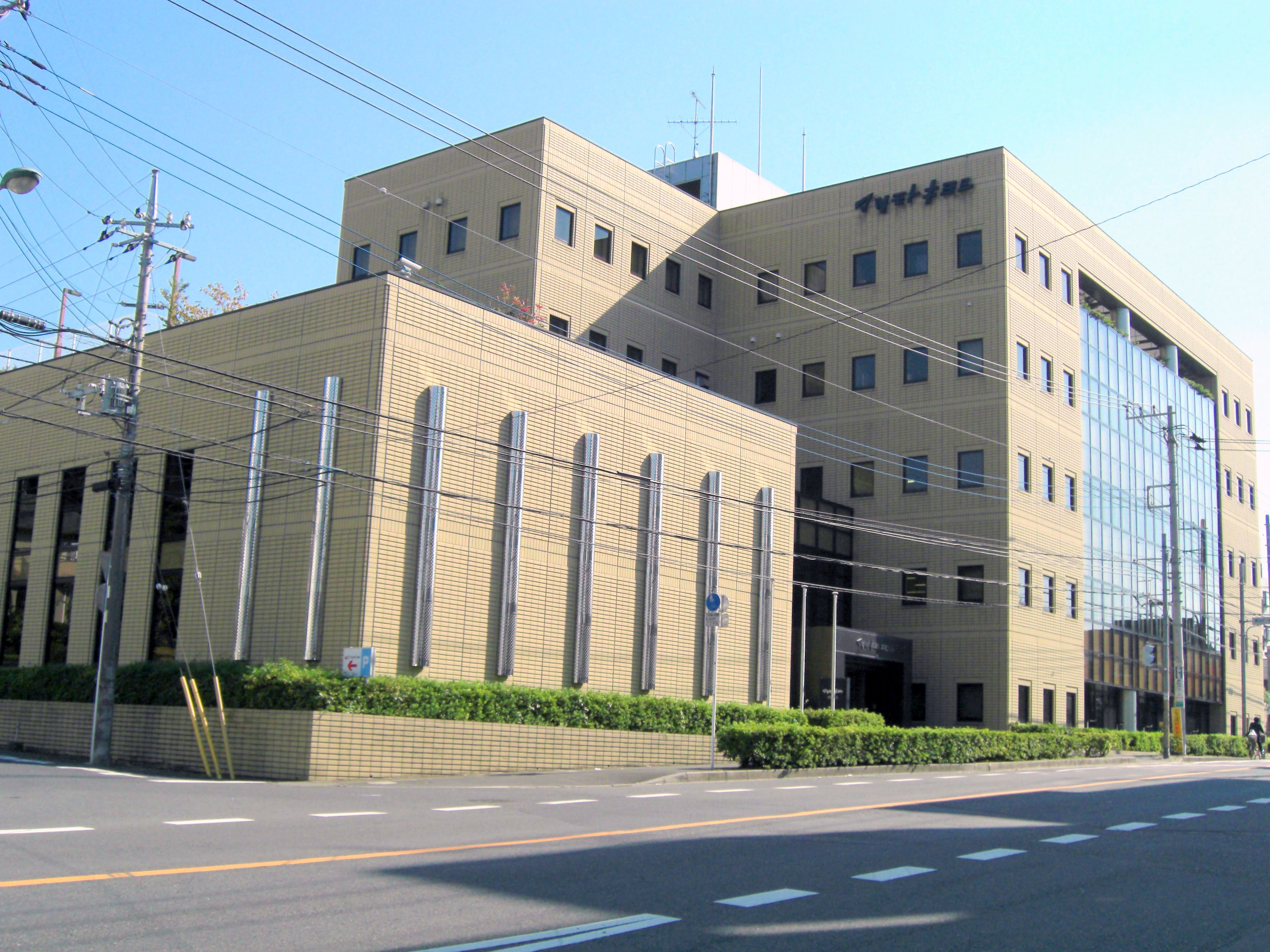
- Matsumoto Kiyoshi Headquarters
- Native name: 株式会社マツモトキヨシ
- Industry: Pharmacy
- Founded: January 8, 1954
- Founder: Kiyoshi Matsumoto
- Headquarters: Matsudo, Chiba, Japan
- Website: Matsumoto Kiyoshi Co., Ltd.

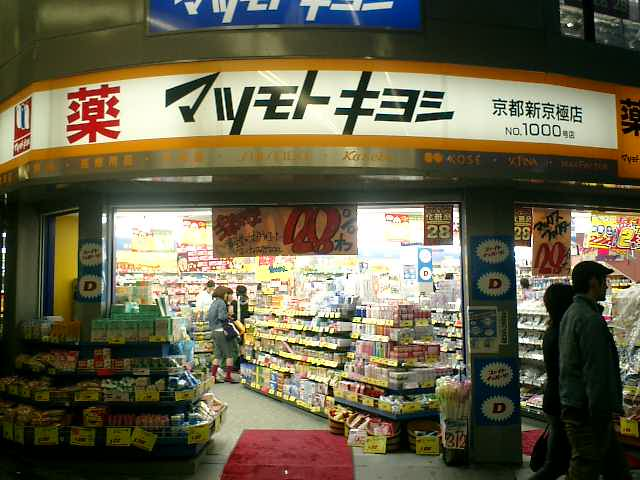
The chain's 1000th location on Shinkyōgoku Street, Kyoto

Matsumotokiyoshi Co., Ltd. (株式会社マツモトキヨシ, Kabushiki gaisha Matsumoto Kiyoshi) is a Japanese drugstore chain founded in 1932. The company is headquartered in Matsudo, Chiba Prefecture. The company is named after its founder Kiyoshi Matsumoto.

Selling items at reasonable prices, Matsumoto Kiyoshi mainly operate small stores in urban areas in the Kanto region, Tokai region and Kansai regions. Stores in other regions are operated by Matsumotokiyoshi Group companies. The company also operates multiple pharmacies with dispensaries across the country.

The first international outlet opened in Bangkok, Thailand in 2015. As of 2024, there are outlets in Thailand, Taiwan, Singapore, Vietnam, Malaysia and Hong Kong.

== History ==
It was founded in 1932 as Matsumoto Yakusho, a sole proprietorship operated by founder Kiyoshi Matsumoto in Matsudo, and it was incorporated as a company in 1954. In 1987, the company expanded its product offering, which previously only included drugs for people in ill health, to include cosmetics and personal care products.

In June 2020, it opened its first location in Wakayama Prefecture, becoming the first drugstore in Japan to open stores in every prefecture under the same brand.
