= TerryWhite Chemmart =

Australian pharmacy chain

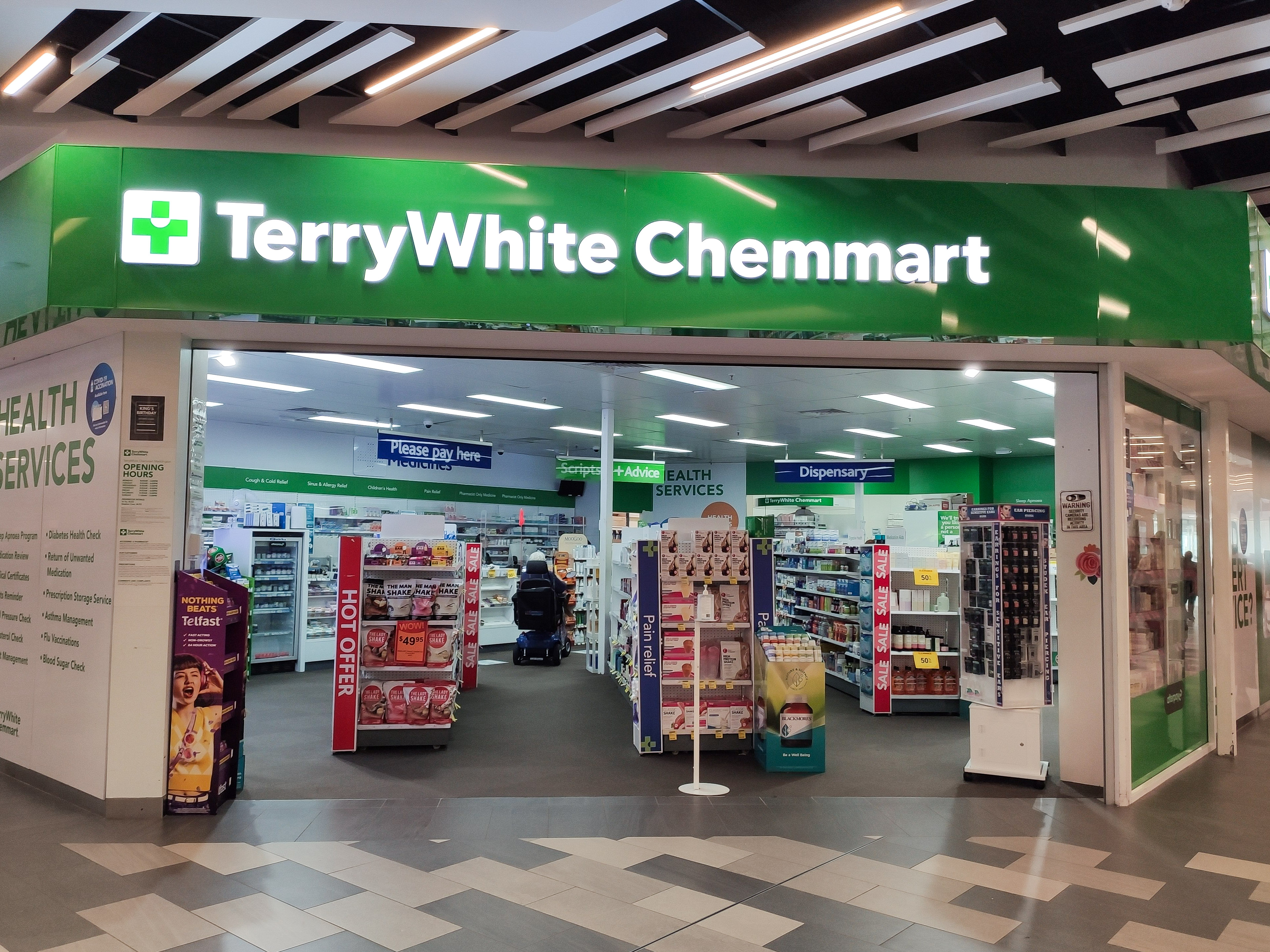
- TerryWhite Chemmart store in Maddington, Western Australia
- Industry: Retail
- Founded: 1959; 67 years ago
- Headquarters: Queensland, Australia
- Number of locations: 550+ (2023)
- Products: Pharmacy, health and beauty
- Number of employees: 5000+
- Parent: EBOS Group
- Website: terrywhitechemmart.com.au

TerryWhite Chemmart is an Australian pharmacy chain owned by the EBOS Group. It is the largest pharmacy chain in Australia, with over 550 stores, as of July 2023. The brand is the result of the 2016 merger of two pharmacy chains – Terry White Chemists and Chemmart.

== History ==
Terry and Rhonda White opened their first pharmacy in Woody Point, Queensland, in 1959. Their network of owned pharmacies grew steadily over the years. In 1994, they established a pharmacy franchise in Australia.

The Terry White Chemists franchise network continued to grow over the next 11 years. This took the total number of franchised pharmacies within the Terry White Group to 225.

In 2015, the Group bought the 60-store Chemplus franchise chain.

In August 2016, the Terry White Group announced a merger with the larger EBOS-owned Chemmart, which created a pharmacy chain with over 500 stores nationally and an annual turnover of A$2 billion. EBOS Group took a 50 per cent stake in Terry White Group as part of the merger. All stores have since been rebranded under the new combined chain with a new name, logo and branding. Since the merger, TerryWhite Chemmart is now the largest pharmacy group in Australia.

In December 2016, Terry White Chemists came under fire, after a single franchisee (who is at liberty "stock and sell products at their discretion") displayed golliwogs underneath a sign reading "Experience a White Christmas". Terry White Chemists subsequently banned the sale of such dolls from sale from any franchise nationwide, and the franchisee "unreservedly apologised" for the "regrettable error".

In 2018, EBOS acquired the remaining 50 per cent of shares in Terry White Group it did not own, making Terry White fully owned by EBOS.
