= Independent Pharmacies in the United States =

An independent pharmacy is a retail pharmacy that is not directly affiliated with any chain of pharmacies and is not owned (or operated) by a publicly traded company. Independent pharmacies are pharmacist-owned, privately held businesses in varying practice settings. They include single-store operations, pharmacist-owned multiple store locations, franchise, compounding, long-term care (LTC), specialty, and supermarket pharmacy operation. Independent pharmacy owners generally have more flexibility to build personalized customer relationships and they strive to differentiate their services from big-chain corporations.

In 2010, there were 23,064 independent pharmacies in the U.S. Independent pharmacies dispensed approximately 1.5 billion prescriptions annually accounting for nearly 40% of the retail prescriptions. The average independent pharmacy had total sales of approximately $4 million and average prescription sales of approximately $3.7 million per location (accounting for 92.5% of all independent pharmacy sales). Over 26% of independent pharmacy owners have ownership in two or more pharmacies. The average independent community pharmacy location dispensed 64,169 prescriptions (205 per day) in 2010, up from 61,071 in 2005.

== The future of independent pharmacies ==
=== Negatives ===
The number of independent pharmacies has been steadily declining over recent years due to the difficulty of competing with large chain corporations. Large chains have the advantage of a vastly greater reach and an abundance of resources, and sometimes independent pharmacies cannot keep up with the level of production.

=== Positives ===
Due to their smaller size, independent community pharmacies tend to have a better connection to their local community and have the ability to get to know their patients beyond their medications. For this reason, and because of the extra services that they can often receive, many patients prefer independent pharmacies.

There are also a variety of state and national independent pharmacy associations that allow pharmacists to connect with each other and further educate and develop themselves.

== Patient services and niche practicing ==
=== Delivery services ===
The most commonly offered services by independent pharmacies are delivery services.

=== Durable medical goods ===
Most independent pharmacies provide durable medical equipment, such as diabetes testing supplies, therapeutic shoes for diabetics, prosthetics, orthotics and other supplies to meet essential health needs.

=== Compounding ===
Compounding pharmacists provide customized medications ordered by prescribers, sometimes when all other options will not work. Compounded medications are prepared by pharmacists for individual patients, often with special needs, and/or as a result of relationships with medical specialists, such as dermatologists, oncologists, pediatricians, and veterinarians who are unable to take medication in its originally manufactured form.

=== Diabetes training ===
Independent pharmacists provide diabetes care and management to help patients achieve therapeutic and lifestyle goals. Pharmacists screen patients at high risk for diabetes, assess patient health status, educate patients to care for themselves, monitor outcomes, and when appropriate, refer patients to other health care professionals. Some independent pharmacists provide patients with diabetes self-management education/training (DSME/T) that teaches patients to adhere to the standards of care including, but not limited to, healthy diet, physical exercise, medication, self-monitoring, healthy coping and behavior change, and reducing risks (i.e. diabetic foot care).

=== Medication therapy management ===
Medication therapy management (MTM) programs are designed to optimize the benefits of prescribed drugs, improve medication use, reduce the risk of adverse drug events and drug interactions, and increase patient adherence to prescribed regimens.

=== Immunizations ===
Pharmacists are approved to administer vaccinations in all 50 states. In 2009, pharmacists throughout the nation administered hundreds of thousands of doses of H1N1 influenza vaccine and demonstrated the critical role pharmacists play in public health and the value they deliver to their patients.

Independent pharmacies may also offer routine and travel vaccines, including vaccines for pneumococcal, meningococcal, Hepatitis B, human papillomavirus (HPV), herpes zoster (shingles), typhoid, and yellow fever.

=== Medicare plan comparisons ===
Many pharmacies offer Medicare plan comparisons. Pharmacists help patients/enrollees navigate their options, but must beware of steering. Many pharmacies use plan comparison software available to consumers through the Medicare website.

=== Smoking cessation ===
Independent pharmacies provide tobacco cessation counseling including recommendations for over-the-counter nicotine replacement products, advice, and continuous counseling.

=== Asthma management ===
Independent pharmacists assist patients to manage and maintain asthma control. Asthma management services include education on the types and purposes of asthma medications; demonstrating the correct techniques on using their oral medications, inhaled medications, and peak flow meters; reinforcing and clarifying instructions as outlined in their asthma management plan provided by their physician; and addressing patient concerns. In addition, pharmacists can refer patients who use over-the-counter medications to physicians for medical care.

=== Long-term care ===
Independent pharmacists provide care for the nation's 40.2 million seniors in nursing homes, assisted living facilities, hospice, and home-based care. They also provide many specialty services for seniors such as nutrition assessment and support, intravenous therapy, durable medical equipment, ostomy, and pain management.

=== Front end products ===
Independent pharmacies not only provide prescription products and services, but also offer an array of nonprescription products and services, including cough and cold medications, antacids, vitamins, herbal supplements, ear and eye products, and other health-related products. Some independent pharmacies offer an assortment of gifts and greeting cards. These additional offerings vary from pharmacy to pharmacy.

=== Disposal programs ===
Some independent pharmacies offer medication disposal programs (see www.disposemymeds.org) to help their patients safely dispose of unused and expired medicines that may be dangerous to others and to the environment.

== Patient satisfaction ==
=== Gallup Poll ===
According to a Gallup, for more than a decade, America's pharmacists have been recognized as one of the most trusted professions in America, Pharmacists continue to maintain a high satisfaction rate among consumers, ranking as the 2nd most-trusted profession in 2011.

=== Consumer Reports Poll ===
In 2011, readers of Consumer Reports magazine scored independent community pharmacies the highest based on overall satisfaction and service among all types of pharmacy providers. Readers who responded to a survey expressed their highest satisfaction rate (94%) regarding their experiences at a neighborhood independent pharmacy, based on pharmacists’ knowledge about drugs and other products, helpfulness and courtesy, speed, accuracy, and personal service. In addition, at independent pharmacies patients were twice as likely as at chain drugstores to encounter pharmacists who were easy to talk to and provided one-on-one consultations. Senior editor of Consumer Reports, Todd Marks said, “We found that the independents made fewer errors, offered swifter service at the pharmacy counter, and were more likely to have medications ready for pickup when promised.”

=== J.D. Power and Associates ===
Three locally owned and operated, independent pharmacy franchises, Good Neighbor Pharmacy, Health Mart, and the Medicine Shoppe were rated the top 3 in customer satisfaction in the chain drug store segment of the J.D. Power and Associates 2011 U.S. National Pharmacy Study.

== Independent pharmacies in rural America ==
Independent pharmacies are far more likely than chain pharmacies to operate in traditionally under-served and rural areas where patient accessibility is a deep concern. Independents represent 38% of all retail pharmacies but represent 52% of all rural retail pharmacies. There are just slightly over 1,800 independent pharmacies operating as the only retail pharmacy within their rural community.

A study conducted by the RUPRI Center for Health Policy Analysis and the North Carolina Rural Health Research & Policy Analysis Center found that 91% of all sole community pharmacies are located in rural communities and that 22% are located more than 20 miles from the next closest retail pharmacy. Furthermore, the study found that 83% of sole community pharmacists provide important services to other health care organizations, with blood pressure checks, diabetes counseling, and immunizations as the most common services provided.

Challenges Faced by Independent Community Pharmacies

Independent pharmacies face several key challenges. First, independent pharmacies are unable to negotiate on a level playing field with pharmacy benefit managers (PBMs). Second, independent pharmacies are disadvantaged when health plan sponsors (employers, et al.) decide to require, or financially incentivize, patients to use mail order pharmacies. Third, many independent pharmacies are challenged by the growth of “preferred pharmacy” health plan designs that greatly restrict the patients’ choice of pharmacy.

Other key issues for community pharmacists are creating a fair reimbursement system for generic drugs covered under Medicaid, preserving patient access to durable medical equipment provided by local pharmacies, and implementing greater regulations and transparency over pharmacy benefit managers.
