= Nishikata =

Nishikata (Japanese: 西方, meaning "western area") may refer to:

- Nishikata, Tochigi, a former town in Kamitsuga District, Tochigi Prefecture, Japan
- Nishikata Station, a railway station in Satsumasendai, Kumamoto Prefecture, Japan

== People with the surname ==
- Jinya Nishikata (西方 仁也, born 1968), Japanese ski jumper
- Ryo Nishikata (西方 凌, born 1980), Japanese actress and television personality

=== Fictional characters ===
- Nishikata (西片), protagonist of the manga series Teasing Master Takagi-san
