= Pharmacy of the Eastern Vaud Hospitals =

Interhospital pharmacy in Switzerland

- Established: 1 January 1984 (42 years ago)
- Types: medical organization
- Headquarters: Rennaz
- Country: Switzerland
- Membership: 5 hospital (2020)

The Pharmacy of the Eastern Vaud Hospitals (French: Pharmacie des hôpitaux de l'Est lémanique, PHEL) is an inter-hospital pharmacy constituted as a nonprofit organization on 1 January 1984 by seven regional hospitals in the eastern part of the canton of Vaud, and considered of public interest. It was the second of its kind in Switzerland.

In total, the regional hospitals of the canton of Vaud have set up three similar pharmacies to supply them with medicines and provide a local pharmaceutical assistance. Following the creation of the Pharmacy of the Eastern Vaud Hospitals, the Pharmacie Interhospitalière de la Côte (PIC) in Morges was created in 1996, and then the Pharmacie des Hôpitaux du Nord Vaudois et de la Broye (PHNVB) in 2011 in Yverdon-les-Bains.

== History ==
=== Beginnings (1982-1983) ===
On 1 February 1982, the Aigle Hospital, the Lavaux Hospital in Cully, the Montreux Hospital, the Mottex Hospital in Blonay, the Nant Foundation in Corsier-sur-Vevey, the Providence Hospital in Vevey and the Samaritan Hospital in Vevey decided to sign an agreement to hire a pharmacist to provide them with a joint supply of drugs. He settled in the former pharmacy of the Samaritain Hospital and was also responsible for the pharmacies of the other six regional public-interest hospitals in the region.

Previously, the regional hospitals had been supplied by community pharmacists on a rotating basis. However, there were two major problems: the lack of a permanent pharmaceutical service within the hospitals in case of emergencies and the cost of the products, as isolated purchases did not allow economies of scale.

=== Vevey (1984-2019) ===
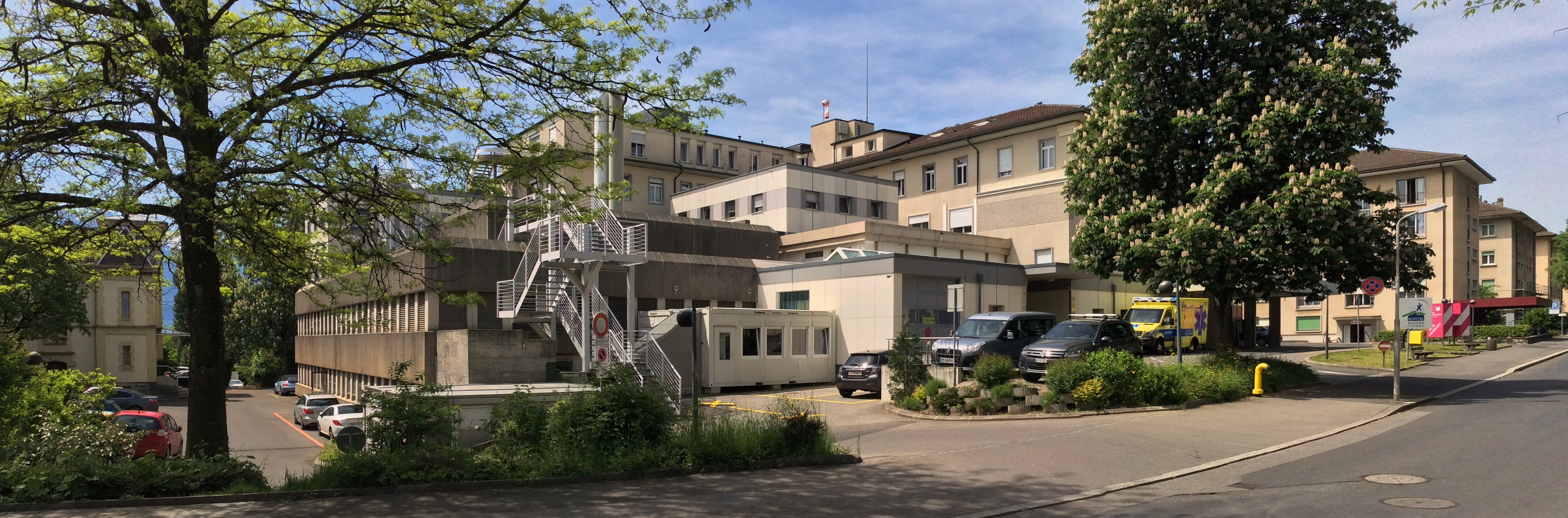
Former medico-technical building of the Samaritan Hospital

In the autumn of 1983, the Samaritan Hospital inaugurated a new pharmacy in its new medico-technical building. On 1 January 1984, the 7 regional hospitals of the Eastern Vaud, taking advantage of this infrastructure, established a single central pharmacy as a non-profit association under the initial name of "Association de la Pharmacie centrale des hôpitaux de l'Est vaudois".

The PHEL is thus the second central pharmacy in Switzerland created to supply drugs to several hospitals in a region, after the pharmacy of the Central Institute of Valais Hospitals (ICHV), created in 1978.

The PHEL continued to develop and François Rouiller, a pharmacist, writer and illustrator, joined the team in 1988, working mainly as a clinical pharmacist. In 1990, the Rive-Neuve palliative care foundation, then based in Villeneuve, joined the founding members of the PHEL, while the Aigle Hospital left at the turn of the century, to be replaced at the same time by the Miremont Foundation in Leysin. Finally, the Pays-d'Enhaut Hospital in Château-d'Œx joined the PHEL in 2011.

At the same time, a series of hospital mergers changed the balance of PHEL's membership. First, the Samaritan, Montreux and Mottex hospitals merged in 1998 to form a multi-site hospital on the Riviera, to which the Providence Hospital was added in 2004. Subsequently, the Riviera Hospital merged with the Chablais Hospital to form the Riviera-Chablais, Hospital, Vaud-Valais (HRC), which has since become the principal member of the PHEL.

In this context, the PHEL has gradually taken on more responsibilities in the Chablais Valaisan region. In 2012, it took over the responsibility of the centralised preparation and supply of chemotherapies for the Chablais Hospital (site of Monthey). Then, at the end of 2016, the HRC entrusted it with the entire supply of drugs for its Aigle and Monthey sites, as well as with the responsibility for their pharmaceutical assistance.

=== Rennaz (from 2019) ===
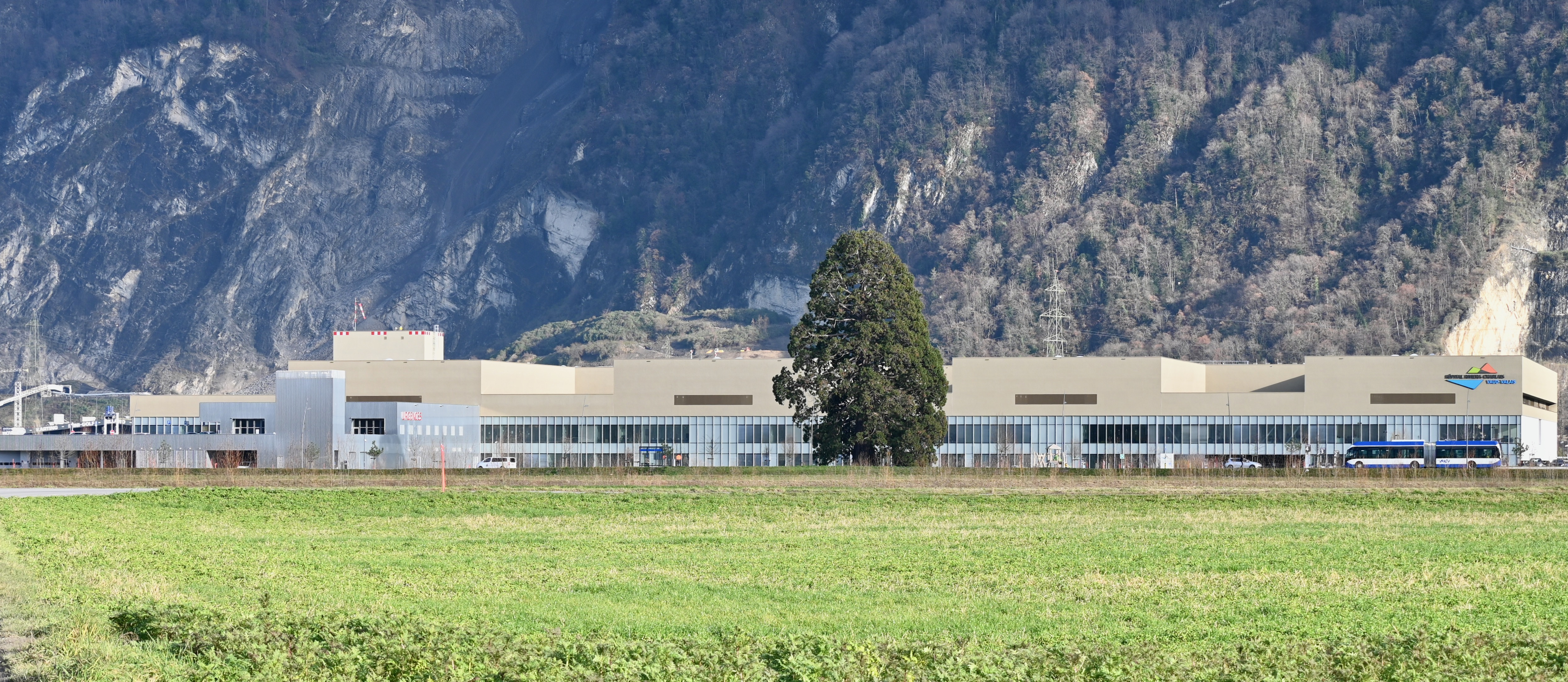
Rennaz Hospital Centre as seen from Noville VD

As a result of the construction of the Rennaz Hospital Centre by the HRC, the PHEL moved its headquarters and central pharmacy to Rennaz, in the Chablais Vaudois, at the beginning of October 2019 one month before the relocation of the various HRC sites, which it also accompanied on a pharmaceutical point of view. On this occasion, the PHEL also modernised its equipment with the acquisition of a global dispensing robot and with the development of new services, in particular that of ward pharmacy technicians.

As part of the transfer of the HRC to Rennaz, the Miremont Foundation was transferred to private ownership. Therefore, on 1 January 2020, the PHEL was reduced to five members: the Lavaux Hospital, the Nant Foundation, the Health Pole of the Pays-d'Enhaut, the Rive-Neuve Foundation and the HRC, whose delegate is chairing the PHEL.

Shortly after moving into its new facilities, the PHEL, like the HRC and other Swiss hospitals, faced the COVID-19 pandemic and quickly adapted its operations to ensure the supply of drugs and clinical services to its member hospitals and private partners. During the first two waves of the pandemic, the PHEL was supported in some of its missions by the Vaud Civil Protection. In 2021, the PHEL was also involved in the preparation of doses of the COVID-19 vaccine, particularly in the vaccination centres of Rennaz and Montreux.

At the same time, following the HRC, the PHEL have faced also transitional financial difficulties, but then returned to financial equilibrium. Like all European hospital pharmacies, it subsequently faced a significant shortage of medicines amid the 2021–2023 global supply chain crisis.

== Activities ==
Within the Vaud Hospital Federation, the three inter-hospital pharmacies, PHEL, PIC and PHNVB, work together, in particular by negotiating preferential purchasing conditions with pharmaceutical suppliers. Since 2002, thanks to a common approach, they have all been ISO 9001 certified, which attests of the quality of their services.

In addition to regional hospitals, these three inter-hospital pharmacies can also serve private clinics and nursing homes. The PHEL is a partner of several private clinics on Riviera vaudoise and of about fifteen nursing homes in eastern Vaud.

The aim of the PHEL is to provide its members and other partners with:

- quality pharmaceutical assistance;
- medicines and other products under the best conditions.

In this context, it provides pharmaceutical logistics, manufacturing and clinical pharmacy services and is also involved in various teaching and research programmes, being nested in the Health Valley.

=== Pharmaceutical logistics ===
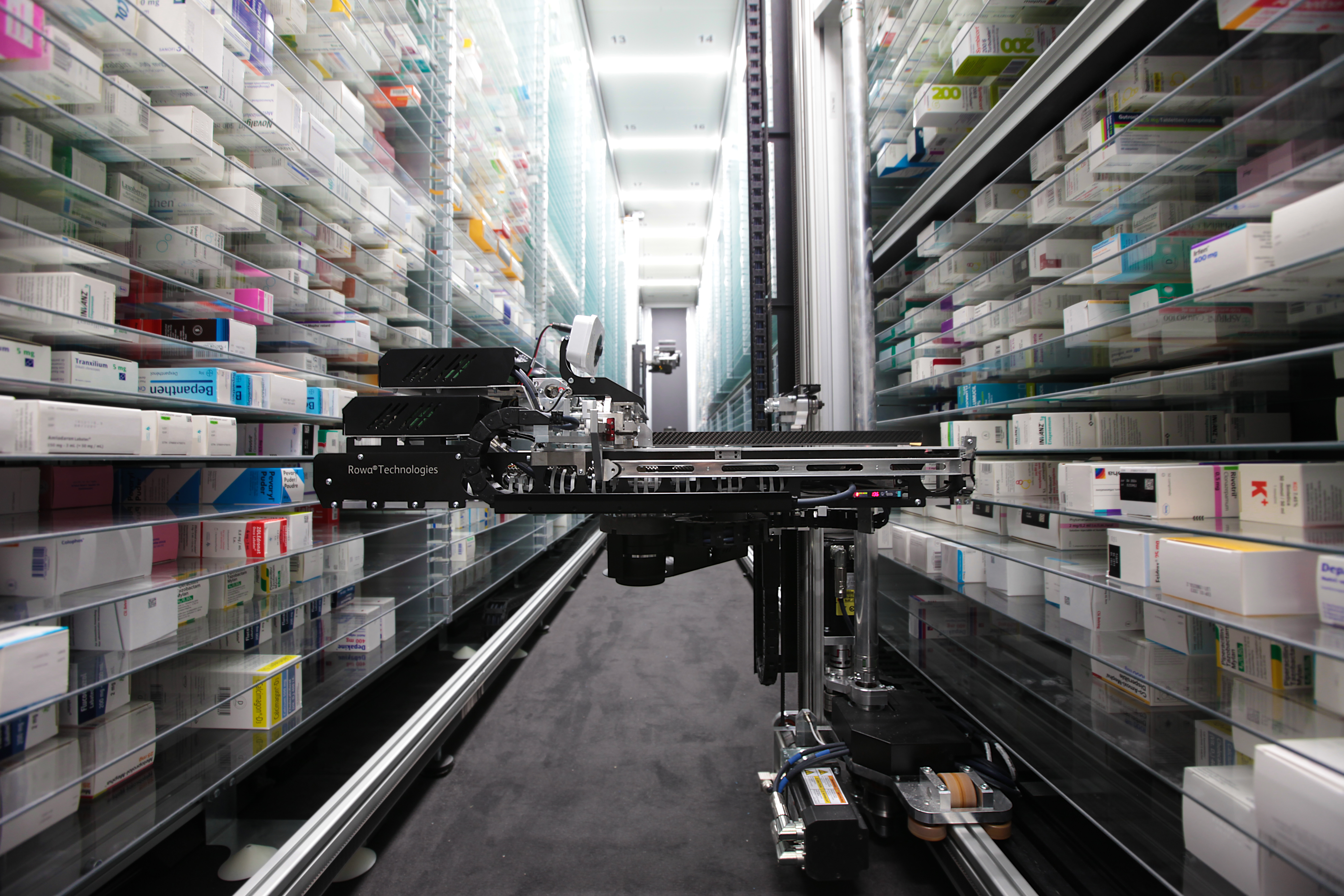
Dispensing robot of the Pharmacy of the Eastern Vaud Hospitals

Whether for its member hospitals, private clinics or nursing homes, the PHEL purchases many medicines in directly from the pharmaceutical industry. In 2018, to further optimise its purchasing conditions, it joined the Centrale d'achat et d'ingénierie biomédicale (CAIB), created by the Centre hospitalier universitaire vaudois and the Hôpitaux universitaires de Genève. The PHEL stores the drugs purchased, notably in an automated dispensing robot, and then redistributes them to various partners.

Many pharmacy technicians also work directly in the wards, some of which are equipped with automated dispensing cabinets at the HRC, thus helping to improve the safety, traceability and stock management of drugs.

=== Manufacturing ===
Since its creation, PHEL has had a galenic pharmacy laboratory, in particular for the preparation of ointments, syrups or capsules that are not on the market. Since 2009, it has also been responsible for the preparation of around 8,000 chemotherapy treatments per year, in dedicated clean rooms that were completely modernised when it moved to Rennaz.

Since 2011, PHEL has also been preparing individualised weekly sachets for the majority of the residents of its partner nursing homes, using a dedicated automat to improve the safety of the preparation.

=== Clinical pharmacy ===
Through its pharmaceutical assistance and clinical pharmacy activities, the PHEL aims to promote effective, safe and economical pharmacotherapy for patients in its partner institutions. Since 1994, a Drug Committee of the Hospitals of Eastern Vaud has also maintained a restrictive list of medicines to ensure such therapy.

Specially trained PHEL staff also conduct medication reviews of patients during colloquia or clinical visits with medical and nursing staff. The regular presence of pharmacists on the wards began in 1998, following a pilot project at the Aigle Hospital the previous year. Today, the PHEL also contributes to the various patient safety initiatives of its members, for example in the field of pharmacovigilance.

The PHEL also offers its pharmaceutical assistance services to its partner nursing homes, in particular in the context of a Vaud cantonal programme "Quality circles in nursing homes".

=== Teaching and research ===
Specific training for the medical and nursing staff of the partner organisations is regularly provided by the PHEL staff, who are also involved in the development of pharmaceutical documents available on the pharmacy's website. Since 1991, pharmacy students have also been regularly welcomed to PHEL for block courses or internships.

Moreover, as a small research institute collaborating with the University of Geneva and the University of Lausanne, the PHEL carries out various research projects in the field of practical pharmacy, such as tobaccology or continuity of pharmaceutical care, some of which are regularly awarded, such as in 2017 by the Swiss Academy of Medical Sciences.

Additionally, since 2017, the PHEL is also one of the main partner of the Specialised Centre for Emergency and Disaster Pharmacy at the University of Geneva, which is supported by the Swiss Confederation, and provides a platform for education and research in the field of emergency and disaster pharmacy. Recently, the PHEL launched a new research and development initiative focusing on sustainable pharmacy, which was presented at the Forum 2025 of the Swiss Consortium for Sustainable Health and Ecological Transformation of the Health System (ETHICH).

In 2027, the pharmacy will also participate in the organisation of the 25th International Congress of Therapeutic Drug Monitoring and Clinical Toxicology, which will be chaired by its head pharmacist.

== Notable people ==
=== Pharmacists ===
- François Rouiller (born 1956) a pharmacist, writer and illustrator
