= A.W. Lucas & Company =

A.W. Lucas & Company was a department store located in Bismarck, North Dakota. A.W. Lucas was established in 1899 as a partnership between A.W. Lucas and William O'Hara. The original location was closed in 1924, however maintained a presence in downtown Bismarck until moving to Gateway Mall when it opened in 1979, before forever closing shortly thereafter.
