= Todd Marks =

American businessman

- Born: Circa. 1975–1976; Syracuse, New York, U.S.
- Education: Loyola University Maryland
- Occupations: Businessman and computer programmer
- Known for: Founder and CEO of Mindgrub Technologies
- Spouse: Nikki Marks (née Nikki McGowan)
- Children: 7 (blended family)
- Website: Mindgrub profile

Todd Marks is an American businessman, technologist, and computer programmer. He is a teacher-turned-technologist who is the founder and CEO of Mindgrub Technologies.

Mindgrub, is a mobile, social and web app consultancy, working with companies and organizations in a variety of industries to bring their brand to digital. Mindgrub has won several awards and worked with clients like Exelon, GraphicAudio, Under Armour, The Universities at Shady Grove, UMBC, Phillips Foods, Wendy's, AOL, and Yamaha.

Marks was a Baltimore Business Journal honoree of 40 Under 40, a two-time nominee for the EY Entrepreneur of the Year Award, a Baltimore Visionary named by Baltimore Magazine, and was elected to the board of directors for the Northeastern Maryland Tech Council (NMTC).

Marks has written and contributed to a number of books including Flash Magic, New Masters of Flash, and Web Design in a Nutshell. Marks also sits on the advisory boards for Loyola University’s MBA program, the Maryland Technology Council (MTC), and the Northeastern Maryland Tech Council (NMTC).

== Early life and education ==
Marks was born in Syracuse, New York. He grew up in Howard County, Maryland, graduated high school in Columbia and studied at Loyola College, where he graduated in 1998 with a Bachelors of Science in Math.

== Career ==
He taught Math and Computer Science and was an Adobe Flash developer during the dot-com boom of the late 1990s. He went into entrepreneurship in 1999, when he helped launch a digital agency. After struggling for several years, he gave up and started working for different companies.

He founded his current company, Mindgrub Technologies, in 2002. The company began in "the greater Oella incubator," as Marks dubbed his basement, where he started working as an independent consultant.

When Apple unveiled the iPhone in 2007, Marks decided to focus on that. He hired a full-time employee and quit his job as an IT consultant the next year.

As his company grew, Marks moved his office to Catonsville and finally to Locust Point, where he established a Google-style relaxed office, complete with an event space, a ping pong table and a climbing wall. The opening was attended by Stephanie Rawlings-Blake, the mayor of Baltimore. From 2013 to 2015, the company hired about a dozen people each year, growing to 60 full-time employees.

To build his team, Marks recruited computer science interns from the University of Maryland, Baltimore County, where he was an adjunct professor of Instructional Technology. He interviewed them while playing Rock Band or Wii Golf together for an hour, deducing their abilities from the way they played. He also employed former Big Huge Games developers when that company went under.

Mindgrub engineers mobile and interactive web apps, integrates social media and gaming. It also develops websites, marketing campaigns, and interactive media. Marks expanded Mindgrub by founding three ancillary companies: Mindgrub Games, which uses Mindgrub software in gaming; viaPlace, which manages augmented reality; and Mindgrub Robotics, which develops autonomous indoor point-to-point delivery robots. Mindgrub has become a tech market leader, working with clients like Exelon, Pierce Atwood, Wendy's, AOL, and Yamaha.

In 2015, Marks acquired 4Thought, a web design and online marketing firm. Mindgrub expanded its web management by becoming a Fast Track partner with Pantheon Systems, migrating all of its clients' websites to the platform.

== Other activities ==
Marks has held lectures, tech workshops, and public discussions at different venues, such as Mid-Atlantic Developer Conference, TEDxBaltimore, the NET/WORK fair, South by Southwest, the Emerging Technology Forum (held at Mindgrub), and hosted the Education Technology Innovation Summit.

Marks has written and contributed to several books on Flash and Dreamweaver. He sits on the advisory board for Loyola University's MBA program and is vice president of the Chesapeake Regional Tech Council.

== Awards and recognition ==
In 2013, Marks was a Baltimore Business Journal's honoree of 40 Under 40, an award spotlighting the business leaders under the age of 40 who excel in their industry.

He was a two-time nominee for the EY Entrepreneur of the Year Award, in 2013 and 2014. Marks was also named to the Daily Record’s list of Most Admired CEOs in 2013, 2019, and in 2021, an award identifying Maryland business executives for their accomplishments throughout their career.

In 2018, Baltimore Magazine recognized Todd as a Baltimore Visionary in its list of 30 change-makers who are shaping the future of the city. He was also elected to the board of directors for the Northeastern Maryland Tech Council (NMTC).

His company Mindgrub has won more than 30 awards and prizes for its products, growth, and company culture.
