= EBOS Group =

ASX and NZX listed Healthcare Company

EBOS Group Limited
- Type: Public
- Traded as: ASX: EBO; NZX: EBO
- Industry: Healthcare; Animal care
- Founded: 1922; 104 years ago
- Headquarters: Melbourne, Australia; Christchurch, New Zealand
- Number of locations: 109 (2022)
- Areas served: Australia; New Zealand; Southeast Asia
- Key people: Elizabeth Coutts (Chairperson); Adam Hall (CEO)
- Revenue: ▲ A$10.7 billion (2022)
- Operating income: ▲ A$355 million (2022)
- Net income: ▲ A$228 million (2022)
- Total assets: ▲ A$120 million (2022)
- Number of employees: 5000 (2022)
- Website: www.ebosgroup.com

EBOS Group Limited is the largest marketer, wholesaler, and distributor of medical and pharmaceutical products in Australasia. It is also a major provider of animal care products.

== History ==
EBOS was founded in 1922 as Early Brothers Trading Company Limited in Christchurch, New Zealand. Initially the company sold lamps for horse drawn carriages, but later expanded into a broad array of goods such as heating equipment, household appliances and healthcare supplies. In the 1950s the company narrowed its business focus to healthcare and rebranded as Early Brothers Dental and Surgical Supplies Limited in 1954. EBOS Dental and Surgical Supplies was listed on the New Zealand Stock Exchange in 1967 and formally rebranded as EBOS Group Limited in 1986. EBOS first entered the Australian market in 1996 and was listed on the Australian Stock Exchange in 2013. EBOS attained a position in the S&P/NZX 50 in 2006, was added to the S&P/NZX 10 in 2022 and in 2023 was added to the MSCI Index.

== Subsidiaries ==
EBOS Group owns a controlling interest in over 100 companies throughout Australia, New Zealand and Southeast Asia. In 2013 EBOS acquired Symbion for NZ$1.1 billion thereby inheriting the Faulding pharmaceutical brand. In 2016 EBOS acquired a controlling interest in Terry White Group, Australia's largest pharmacy retailer, and in 2018 acquired all minority shares to establish a 100% holding.

EBOS entered the medical devices distribution sector in 2019. EBOS greatly expanded its presence in that market in 2021 when it acquired LifeHealthcare's subsidiaries in Australia and New Zealand, as well as a controlling share in its Asian subsidiary, Transmedic, for A$1.17 billion.

EBOS Group also holds a number of animal care subsidiaries, such as Black Hawk Premium Pet Care, which was acquired for A$57.8 million in 2014. Animal care made up 16% of the group's overall earnings in 2014, but has grown rapidly to make up 20% of overall earnings in 2023.
