= Boone Drug =

American drug store chain

Boone Drugs, Inc.
- Company type: Pharmacy
- Founded: 1919
- Headquarters: Boone, North Carolina
- Products: Retail/Pharmacy
- Website: http://www.boonedrug.com/

Boone Drugs is a drug store chain with 15 locations in North Carolina and Tennessee.

== History ==
Boone Drug Company began operation in downtown Boone, North Carolina in 1919. The business was founded and operated by Dr. George Kelly Moose until 1959. In 1939 the business was incorporated in North Carolina. The single store served as a pharmacy and soda fountain; in the 1950s the soda fountain operation grew and a grill was added by expanding into the adjacent A&P Store.

The popularity of the soda fountain increased further in the 1980s and a rear addition to the building was created in order to accommodate 50 people.
