= Super-Pharm =

Israeli multinational pharmacy chain

- Super-Pharm logo in Israel (2008–present)
- Type: Private
- Industry: Drugstore, Retail
- Founded: 1978
- Founder: Leon Koffler
- Headquarters: Herzliya, Israel
- Number of locations: 258 (Israel), 78 (Poland), Former locations: 87 (China)
- Key people: Leon Koffler (Chairman); Nitzan Lavi (CEO)
- Products: Drugs, Health
- Revenue: $1.2 billion (2010)
- Number of employees: 9000
- Website: Super-Pharm (Israel); Super-Pharm (Poland)

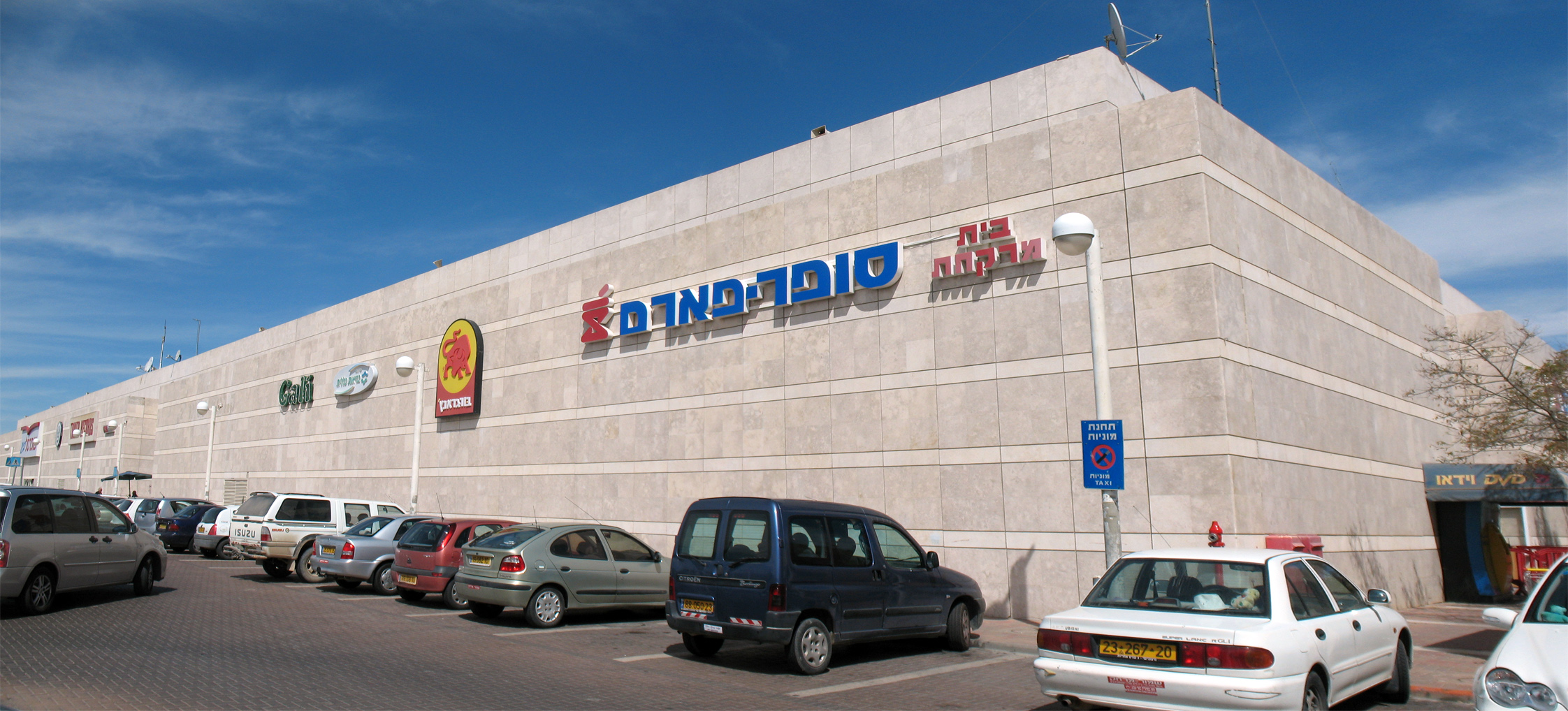
A Super-Pharm store in Arad

Super-Pharm (Hebrew: סופר-פארם) is an Israeli multinational pharmacy chain. It also operates in Poland, and previously operated in China. Super-Pharm was founded by Murray Koffler with his two oldest children, Leon and Theo. The pharmacy uses a similar logo, and has private-label brands (such as Life), as Shoppers Drug Mart in Canada, which was also founded by Koffler.

== History ==
In 1921, Leon Koffler began Koffler Drug Stores. In 1941, his son Murray Koffler inherited two drug stores, called "Koffler's Drugs"; by 1962, Koffler's had grown to a chain of 17 pharmacies, which Murray then renamed "Shoppers Drug Mart" in the 1970s. During the 1970s, Koffler visited Israel; following this visit, he decided to set up a chain similar to his one in Canada. Co-founded with his son Leon and daughter Theo. The first Super-Pharm pharmacy was opened in the Neve Amirim neighborhood of Herzliya, Israel in 1979.

Theo Koffler, co-founder and VP, focused on the cosmetic marketing and strategic operational planning.

The drug store was different from pharmacies in the past in that it was open on the Jewish Sabbath (Saturday), and sold products that were not drugs. Two years later, they opened a second pharmacy in Jerusalem; 1985 saw the opening of a Super-Pharm branch in the Ayalon shopping mall, which was their first location in a shopping mall.

In July 2007, Bank Leumi acquired 18% stake in for 190 million shekels. This gave Super-Pharm a company value of NIS 1.05 billion shekels.

On 4 January 2011, the trade publication Chain Drug Review recognized Super-Pharm as the Global Chain Drug Retailer of the Year for 2010.

In April 2019, Union Group headed by the Horesh family bought approximately 34% of Super-Pharm from the present investors Leumi Investments, Discount Investments and Leon Koffler.

== Private label ==
Since 1995, Super-Pharm have sold products under their private label Life, and LifeStyle, both of which Shoppers Drug Mart also sells. This brand includes more than 400 different products from toiletries, to medicine, to food products. In 2007, the Life brand made up approximately 13% of their total sales.

== Operation ==
=== Israel (Company Origin) ===
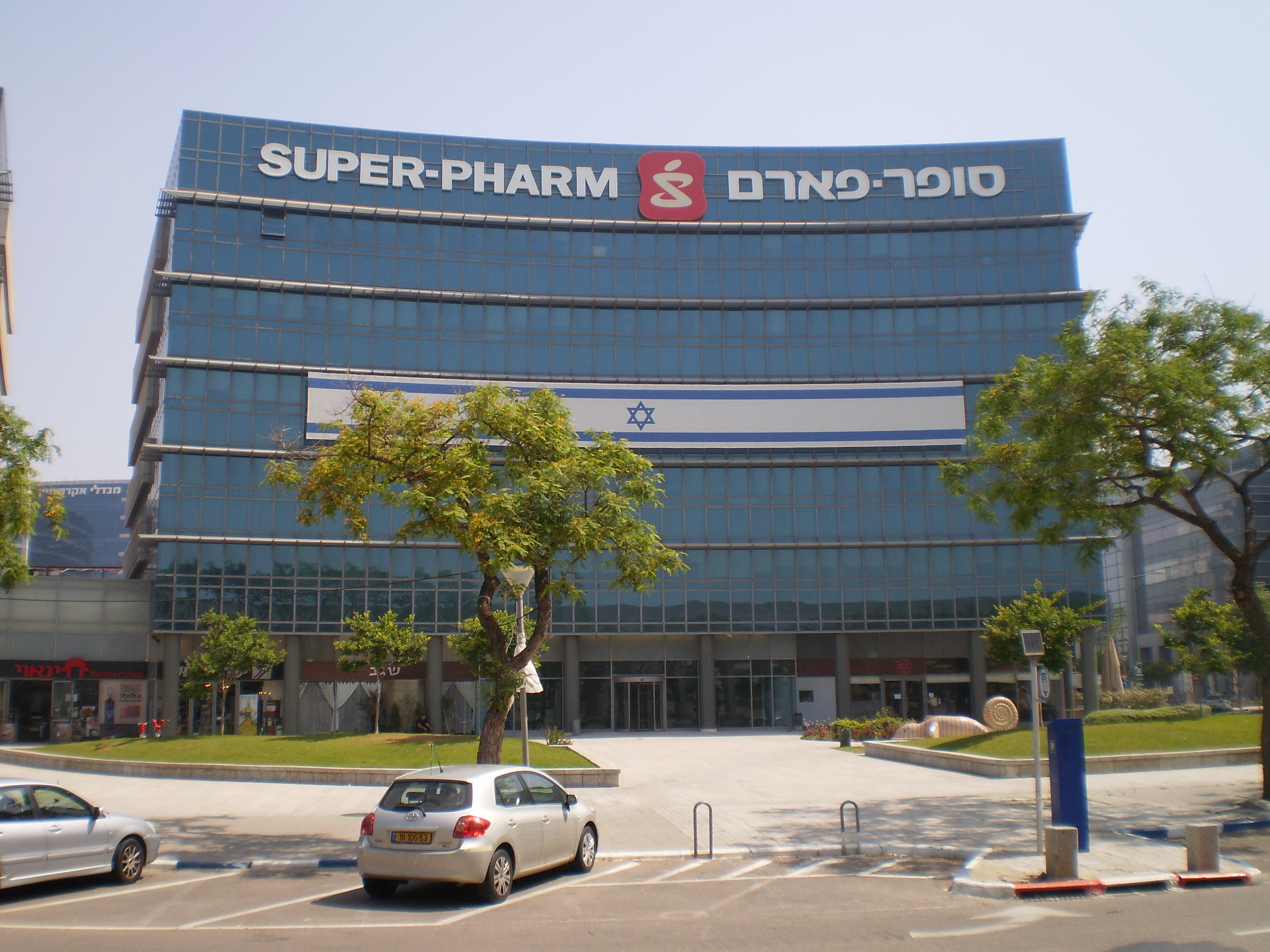
Super-Pharm headquarters in Herzliya

Since opening its first store in 1978, Super-Pharm has grown to 235 stores spread across the entire country. It has achieved the position as the largest drugstore chain in Israel. Super-Pharm is one of the country’s largest employers of non-Jewish Israelis, with close to 20% of their workforce, about 1,000 employees (out of 5,800), are Israeli Arabs; additionally, 25 of the chain's associates franchise stores are owned by Israeli Arabs.

=== Poland ===
In 2001, the Super-Pharm opened its first branch in Poland. As of 2011, the chain operates 33 branches throughout the country. Annual sales of the Polish chain for 2010 are estimated to reach $150 million.

=== China ===
In 2005, the company started operating in China in a joint venture with China's partners; as of 2010, the company operated 87 stores in the country.

== Stores ==
Israel || 235 Stores

China || 87 Stores

Poland || 33 Stores

  - The Company Might Open More Stores And The Information Above Will Have To Be Changed.**

edited 17th of april 2022
