= Lewis Drug =

American drug store chain

- Company type: Private
- Industry: Drug Stores
- Founded: 1942; 84 years ago
- Founder: Jesse Lewis and George Fredrickson
- Headquarters: Sioux Falls, South Dakota, United States
- Number of locations: 59
- Key people: Mark Griffin: CEO; Scott Cross, Exec VP; Bob Meyer, VP; Gene Elrod, VP; Bill Ladwig, VP
- Revenue: $140 million
- Number of employees: 1,300
- Website: www.lewisdrug.com

Lewis Drug is an American, Sioux Falls, South Dakota based operator of 59 drugstores under the Lewis Drug and the Lewis Family Drug banners in South Dakota, Minnesota, and Iowa.

== History ==
Headquartered in Sioux Falls, the company was established in 1942 by partners Jesse Lewis and George Fredrickson. John Griffin joined the business shortly after that and bought out Jesse Lewis in 1946. It was established in 1942 as the first self-service drug store in South Dakota and the surrounding region. Griffin's son Mark became the sole owner in 1984.

In the fall of 2025, Lewis Drug was acquired by Sanford Health for an undisclosed sum. Currently, Lewis Drug retains its original branding, but all employees are a part of Sanford Health.
