= Cadieux =

Cadieux is a surname. Notable persons with that surname include:

- Anne-Marie Cadieux (born 1963), Canadian actress, film director and screenwriter
- Chester Cadieux, co-founder of QuikTrip, a US chain of convenience stores
- David Cadieux (born 1974), professional heavyweight boxer from Canada
- Geneviève Cadieux (born 1955), Canadian artist
- Jason Cadieux, Canadian film, television and stage actor
- Léo Cadieux, PC OC (1908–2005), Canadian politician
- Lorenzo Cadieux, SJ (1903–1976), Canadian Jesuit priest, historian and academic
- Marcel Cadieux, CC (1915–1981), Canadian civil servant and diplomat
- Paul Cadieux, Canadian film and television producer
- Paul-André Cadieux (born 1947), professional ice hockey forward, coach, sports director
- Pierre Cadieux, PC (born 1948), lawyer and former Canadian politician
- Ray Cadieux (born 1941), ice hockey player
- Sophie Cadieux (born 1977), Quebec actress
- Stephanie Cadieux (born 1972), Canadian politician
- Sylvain Cadieux (born 1974), Canadian archer
- Teri MacDonald-Cadieux (born 1963), Canadian stock car racing driver

== See also ==
- L'Île-Cadieux, Quebec, village and municipality in the Montérégie region of Quebec, Canada
- It's Your Turn, Laura Cadieux, Canadian comedy film
