= Good Neighbor Pharmacy =

American pharmacy retailers' cooperative

Good Neighbor Pharmacy is an American retailers' cooperative network of independently owned and operated pharmacies. It has a business affiliation with Cencora, which sponsors the network and owns the name "Good Neighbor Pharmacy". Good Neighbor Pharmacy received the highest overall score in pharmacy customer satisfaction in the J.D. Power and Associates 2010 and 2011 National Pharmacy Studies. Good Neighbor Pharmacy has also ranked #1 for two years running in Newsweek's “America's Best Customer Service” for the brick and mortar pharmacies and drugstores category.
