= Pharmacies of Norway =

Pharmacies of Norway are dominated by the three large companies Alliance Boots, Apokjeden and Norsk Medisinaldepot. In total there are 606 pharmacies, of which only 16 do not belong to the four dominant chains Apotek 1, Vitusapotek, Boots apotek and Ditt Apotek. 33 pharmacies are state owned as pharmaceutical trusts.

== Structure ==
After the Pharmacy Act then was enforced on March 1, 2001, anyone could own a pharmacy. This has resulted in three corporate chains as well as one for independent stores, including 33 hospital pharmacies and 16 independent outlets. Of the 606 pharmacies, 480 are owned by the chains, 33 are owned by the pharmaceutical trusts, 47 are franchises while 16 are independent. Only 25 pharmacies, owned by 20 pharmacists, are not partially owned by the chains.

=== Chains ===
The three largest chains are vertical owned by the wholesalers while Ditt Apotek is a franchise concept owned by Norsk Medisinaldepot. All the hospital pharmacies use Alliance Healthcare as supplier.

- Apotek 1 (owned by Apotek 1 Gruppen, part of Phoenix Pharmahandel): 425 outlets
- Vitusapotek (owned by Norsk Medisinaldepot, part of Celesio: 284 outlets
- Boots apotek (owned by AmerisourceBergen): 149 outlets
- Ditt Apotek (independents): 71 outlets
- Independent: 27 outlets

=== Hospital pharmacies ===
The four regional health authorities each own a pharmaceutical trust, organized as a health trust, that manages hospital pharmacies. But some hospitals instead use commercial pharmacies that are part of the chains. All 33 hospital pharmacies belong to Ditt Apotek. Total revenue in 2006 was NOK 3.5 billion.

- Southern and Eastern Norway Pharmaceutical Trust: 19 outlets
- Western Norway Pharmaceutical Trust: 6 outlets
- Central Norway Pharmaceutical Trust: 4 outlets
- Northern Norway Pharmaceutical Trust: 4 outlets

== History ==
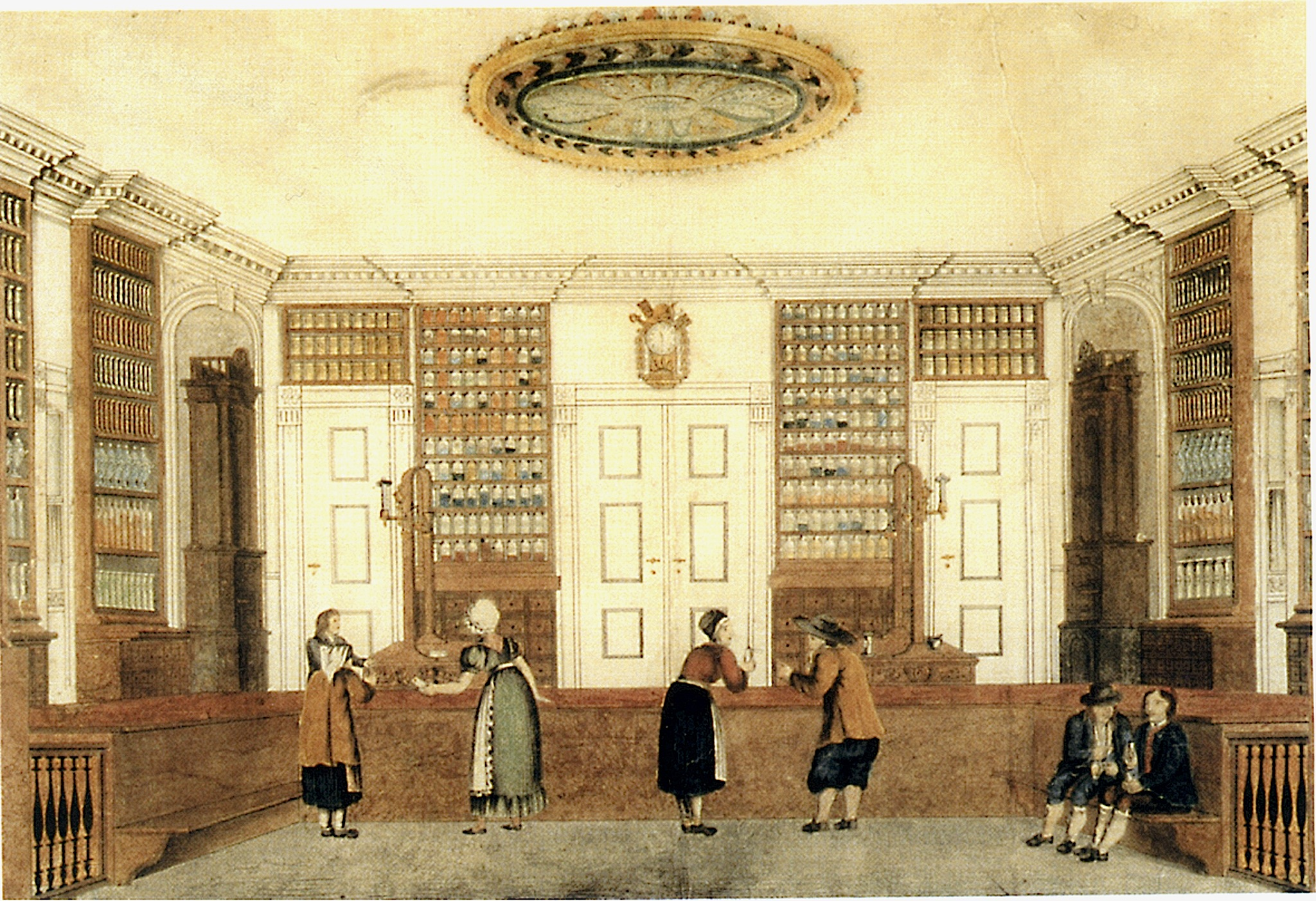
Johan F. L. Dreier: Løveapoteket in Bergen

The first pharmacy in Norway was Svaneapoteket in Bergen in 1595, followed by Svaneapoteket in Oslo in 1628, Hygiea in Stavanger in 1650, elefantapoteket in Kristiansand in 1651 and Løveapoteket in Trondheim in 1661. The first pharmacies received royal permit when they were established, and in 1600 it was decided that only private individuals trained as pharmacists could own a pharmacy, and would receive a monopoly in their area. This concept was kept for more than 400 years.

The first dispansasion from this was given in 1856 when Rikshospitalet was given permission to establish a hospital pharmacy owned by the state. In 1950 a general permission for the state and municipalities to own hospital pharmacies was given. In 1957 the government created Norsk Medisinaldepot (NMD) that was granted the sole rights for wholesale of pharmaceutics in Norway, replacing five private wholesalers. The pharmacists on their hand owned the wholesaler of medical products, Apotekernes Fællesindkjøp, that was acquired by NMD in 1992.

=== Deregulation ===
The first deregulation was of the wholesalers in 1995. This resulted in two competitors of NMD entering the country, Apokjeden, at first owned by the pharmacists and later by Finnish Tamro, and Alliance Unichem. NMD was at first partially privatized in 1997, and then fully sold to Celesio in 2001.

On March 1, 2001 a new law was passed giving the right for anyone to own a pharmacy, with the exception of medical doctors and the pharmaceutical industry. Norway went with this from having one of the most regulated to the least regulated pharmacy markets in Europe. This resulted in a huge consolidation of the pharmacy market, with vertical integration of the wholesalers and retailers. By 2007 84% of all pharmacies are wholly owned by the three wholesalers, and only 16 pharmacies remain outside the chains. At the same time the number of pharmacies has increased from about 400 to more than 600. The dominating new establishments are occurring as establishments close to established pharmacies, and is very little degree in areas without pharmacies.
