= Ellen Birgitte Pedersen =

Norwegian politician (born 1955)

Ellen Birgitte Pedersen (born 1955) is a Norwegian politician for the Socialist Left Party.

Born in Bergen, she took the cand.med. degree in 1979. She has worked in Øksnes Municipality, Bodø Municipality (at the Nordland Hospital Bodø) and Stokmarknes (at the Nordland Hospital Vesterålen). She was also a lecturer at the University of Tromsø. She has been a member of the municipal council of Øksnes Municipality and the Nordland county council, and chaired her party on both municipal and county level. She has also chaired the former health trust Hålogaland Hospital and been a board member of Nordland Hospital Trust.

She joined the Socialist Left Party in 1972, and has chaired the local branch in Øksnes and county branch in Nordland. From June 2008 to October 2009 she served as a State Secretary in the Ministry of Health and Care Services, as a part of Stoltenberg's Second Cabinet.
