= Hålogaland Hospital Trust =

Norwegian health trust

Coordinates: 68°26′31″N 17°24′45″E

Hålogaland Hospital Trust (Norwegian: Hålogalandssykehuset HF) was a health trust owned by Northern Norway Regional Health Authority. The hospital trust was closed down on 1 January 2007. The trust consisted of hospitals in Harstad, Narvik and on Stokmarknes, as well as institutions for treatment of mental disorders and alcohol intoxication.

The hospital and other institutions in Stokmarknes became part of Nordland Hospital Trust on 1 September 2006 and is now known as Nordland Hospital Vesterålen. The hospitals in Harstad and Narvik with associated institutions became part of University Hospital of North Norway (UNN) on 1 January 2007 and is now known as UNN Harstad Hospital and UNN Narvik Hospital.
