= Ingar Pettersen =

Norwegian businessman (born 1946)

- Born: 1946 (age 79–80)
- Occupations: Consultant, servant

Ingar Pettersen (born 1946) is a Norwegian consultant and former civil servant, with prominent positions in the health sector.

== Biography ==
He was the chief financial officer in Oslo municipality in the late 1980s. He resigned in March 1990. From 1996 to 1997 he was an acting chief executive at Ullevål Hospital. He also chaired Aker Hospital from 1994 to August 2000. In October 2000 he was named as chairman of Ullevål Hospital.

He was also leased by Dagsavisen in 2001 to save the newspaper's economy. He has performed the same task in several other newspaper such as Østlendingen, Hamar Arbeiderblad, Ringsaker Blad and Moss Dagblad, the book club De norske Bokklubbene, the publishing houses Aschehoug and Universitetsforlaget. He was hired by Bærum municipality in 2004 to help them cut up to 80 million off the health budget, then in Drammen municipality in mid-2005 to clean up their care services.

From 2005 to 2008 he chaired several health trusts in South and Eastern Norway; Rikshospitalet-Radiumhospitalet and Sørlandet Hospital. A dispute in 2008 on whether to construct a new patient hotel at Radiumhospitalet led to Pettersen's resignation. Briefly in 2005 he was also a board member of Achima Helse, a company that leased workers to the same hospitals.

From 2008 to 2009 he was instead brought in as acting director of the National Museum of Art, Architecture and Design. From March 2009 to August 2010 he went on to serve as acting director of Stavanger University Hospital. He returned to the administrative officer staff of Drammen municipality. In late 2011 he was hired by the University of Oslo.

Preceded by Erik Engebretsen	Chair of Aker Hospital; 1994–2000	Succeeded by
Preceded by Ola Metliaas	Chief executive of Ullevål Hospital (acting); 1996–1997	Succeeded by Karl-Arne Johannessen
Preceded by Karl Glad	Chair of Ullevål Hospital; 2000–	Succeeded by
Preceded by	Chair of Rikshospitalet-Radiumhospitalet; 2005–2008	Succeeded by
Preceded by Allis Helleland	Managing director of National Museum of Art, Architecture and Design (acting); 2008–2009	Succeeded by Audun Eckhoff
Preceded by Gunnar Hall Skavoll	Chief executive of Stavanger University Hospital (acting); 2009–2010	Succeeded by Bård Lilleeng
