= Central Norway Regional Health Authority =

Norwegian regional health authority

Helse Midt-Norge RHF
- Type: Regional health authority
- Industry: Healthcare
- Founded: 2002
- Headquarters: Stjørdal, Norway
- Area served: Central Norway
- Key people: Jan Frich (CEO); Odd Inge Mjøen (Chairman)
- Revenue: ▲NOK 10.3 billion (2006)
- Operating income: NOK -917 million (2006)
- Number of employees: 22,121 (2023)
- Parent: Norwegian Ministry of Health and Care Services
- Subsidiaries: Nordmøre and Romsdal Hospital Trust; Nord-Trøndelag Hospital Trust; St. Olav's Hospital Trust; Sunnmøre Hospital Trust; Central Norway Drug and Alcohol Treatment Trust; Central Norway Pharmaceutical Trust
- Website: www.helse-midt.no

Central Norway Regional Health Authority (Norwegian: Helse Midt-Norge RHF) is a state-owned regional health authority responsible for operating the hospitals in the counties of Trøndelag and Møre og Romsdal in Norway. Based in Stjørdal, the authority operates five health trusts that operate nine hospitals. It is led by chairman Odd Inge Mjøen and CEO Jan Frich.

All real estate related to the hospitals is managed by Helsebygg Midt-Norge, a division of the authority. Other central agencies include Helse Midt-Norge IT (Hemit) that operates the information technology systems as well as Midt-Norsk Helsenett that operates the healthcare information network in Central Norway. St. Olav's Hospital cooperates with the Norwegian University of Science and Technology to provide medical education in Trondheim.

== Subsidiaries ==
- Møre og Romsdal Hospital Trust
  - Ålesund Hospital
  - Kristiansund Hospital
  - Molde Hospital
  - Volda Hospital
- Nord-Trøndelag Hospital Trust
  - Levanger Hospital
  - Namsos Hospital
- St. Olav's Hospital Trust
  - St. Olav's University Hospital, Trondheim
  - Orkdal Hospital
- Central Norway Ambulance
- Central Norway Pharmaceutical Trust

Defunct subsidiaries:

- Central Norway Drug and Alcohol Treatment Trust
- Nordmøre and Romsdal Hospital Trust
- Sunnmøre Hospital Trust
