= Northern Norway Pharmaceutical Trust =

Norwegian health trust

Hospital Pharmacy of North Norway Trust
- Company type: Health Trust
- Industry: Pharmaceutical
- Founded: 2002
- Headquarters: Oslo, Norway
- Area served: Northern Norway
- Parent: Northern Norway Regional Health Authority
- Website: sykehusapotek-nord.no

Hospital Pharmacy of North Norway Trust (Norwegian: Sykehusapotek Nord HF, Northern Sami: Davvi Buohcceviessoapotehka) is a health trust owned by Northern Norway Regional Health Authority that operates five hospital pharmacies. It is part of the Ditt Apotek chain. Norsk Medisinaldepot is its wholesaler.

The pharmacies are located at Tromsø University Hospital and Bodø Hospital, and in Narvik, Harstad, and Hammerfest.
