= Erik Engebretsen =

Norwegian businessperson

Erik Engebretsen is a Norwegian businessperson.

He grew up as a baker's son in Grønland, Oslo, but the family moved to Bestum in his youth. He took economics education at the BI Norwegian Business School and also studied at the University of Wisconsin.

He worked in Actinor, Unitor and Geco before he was hired as chief financial officer in Norsk Data in 1987. In 1989 he was promoted to chief executive officer of the crisis-stricken company. In the summer of 1992 he left Norsk Data to take over as director of the lines Oslo–Kiel and Oslo–Hirtshals in Color Line. He was succeeded by Tor Alfheim. He also chaired Aker Hospital from 1992. The entire board resigned in late 1993, protesting small budgets.

In 1996 Engebretsen went from Color Line to the clothing chain Adelsten. In 1999 he left Adelsten for another company in crisis, Tandberg Television. He later became deputy chairman of Tandberg Television's board and chief executive of Gezina.

Preceded by Kristian Rambjør	Chair of Aker Hospital; 1992–1993	Succeeded by Ingar Pettersen
