= Nord-Trøndelag Hospital Trust =

Health trust in Norway

Helse Nord-Trøndelag HF
- Company type: Health Trust
- Industry: Healthcare
- Founded: 1 January 2002
- Headquarters: Levanger, Norway
- Area served: Nord-Trøndelag
- Key people: Arne Flaat (CEO); Steinar Aspli (Chairman)
- Revenue: ▲1,454 million kr (2004)
- Operating income: 78 million kr (2004)
- Number of employees: 2,459 (2004)
- Parent: Central Norway Regional Health Authority
- Subsidiaries: Levanger Hospital; Namsos Hospital
- Website: hnt.no

Nord-Trøndelag Health Trust (Norwegian: Helse Nord-Trøndelag HF) is a health trust that is subordinate to the Central Norway Regional Health Authority that operates the public specialist health care in Nord-Trøndelag county, Norway.

It includes the two hospitals Levanger Hospital and Namsos Hospital, the district psychiatric centres in Stjørdalshalsen and Kolvereid, and the patient transport system throughout the county. The trust also has medical clinics in Stjørdalshalsen and Steinkjer. The trust has about 2,500 employees and has about 200,000 patient contacts per year.
