= Vestfold Hospital Trust =

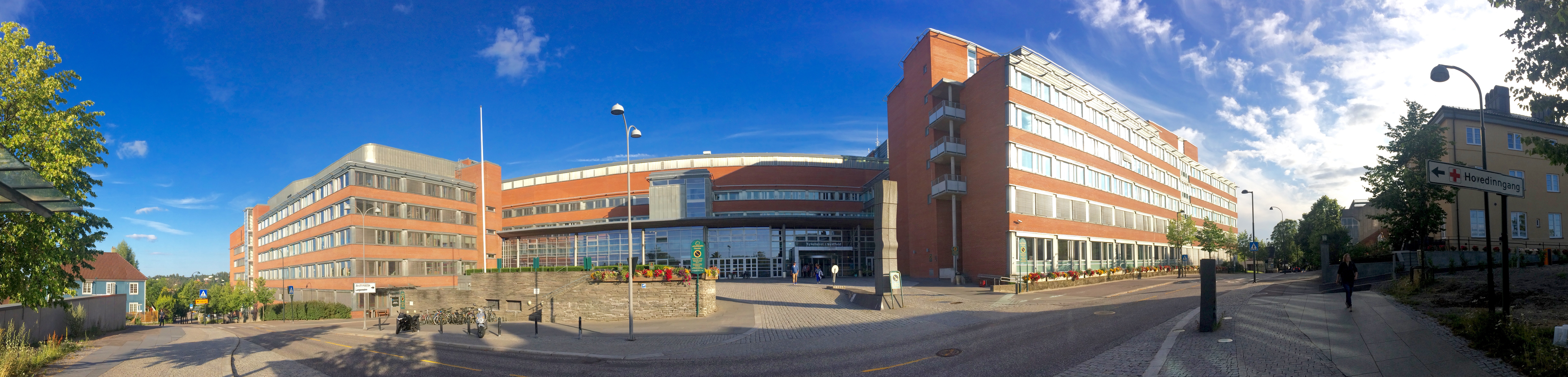
- Tønsberg Hospital, 2015

Geography
- Location: Vestfold, Norway
- Coordinates: 59°16′21″N 10°25′06″E

Organisation
- Network: Southern and Eastern Norway Regional Health Authority

History
- Former names: Jarlsberg and Larvik County Hospital; Vestfold County Hospital; Vestfold Central Hospital
- Opened: 1870 (as a hospital proper); 2002 (as a health trust)

Links
- Website: www.siv.no
- Lists: Hospitals in Norway

Vestfold Hospital Trust (Norwegian: Sykehuset i Vestfold HF) is a public health trust which serves Vestfold, Norway. Its main facility is Tønsberg Hospital, which supplements divisions in Larvik and Stavern. As of 2019, the hospital had 5,400 employees. The hospital was founded in 1870. It was merged with Horten Hospital, originally the Navy Hospital, established in 1828, in 1998, and merged with Sandefjord Hospital and Larvik Hospital in 2000, and with the Psychiatry of Vestfold Trust in 2012. It is owned by the Norwegian state through Southern and Eastern Norway Regional Health Authority.

The hospital was established as Jarlsberg and Larvik County Hospital (Jarlsberg og Larvik amts sygehus). It was renamed Vestfold County Hospital (Vestfold fylkessykehus) in 1918 and was significantly expanded during Nikolai Nissen Paus' tenure as director (1918–1947). It was later renamed Vestfold Central Hospital (Vestfold sentralsykehus) and to the current Vestfold Hospital (Sykehuset i Vestfold) in 2002.

== Gallery ==
Tønsberg Hospital

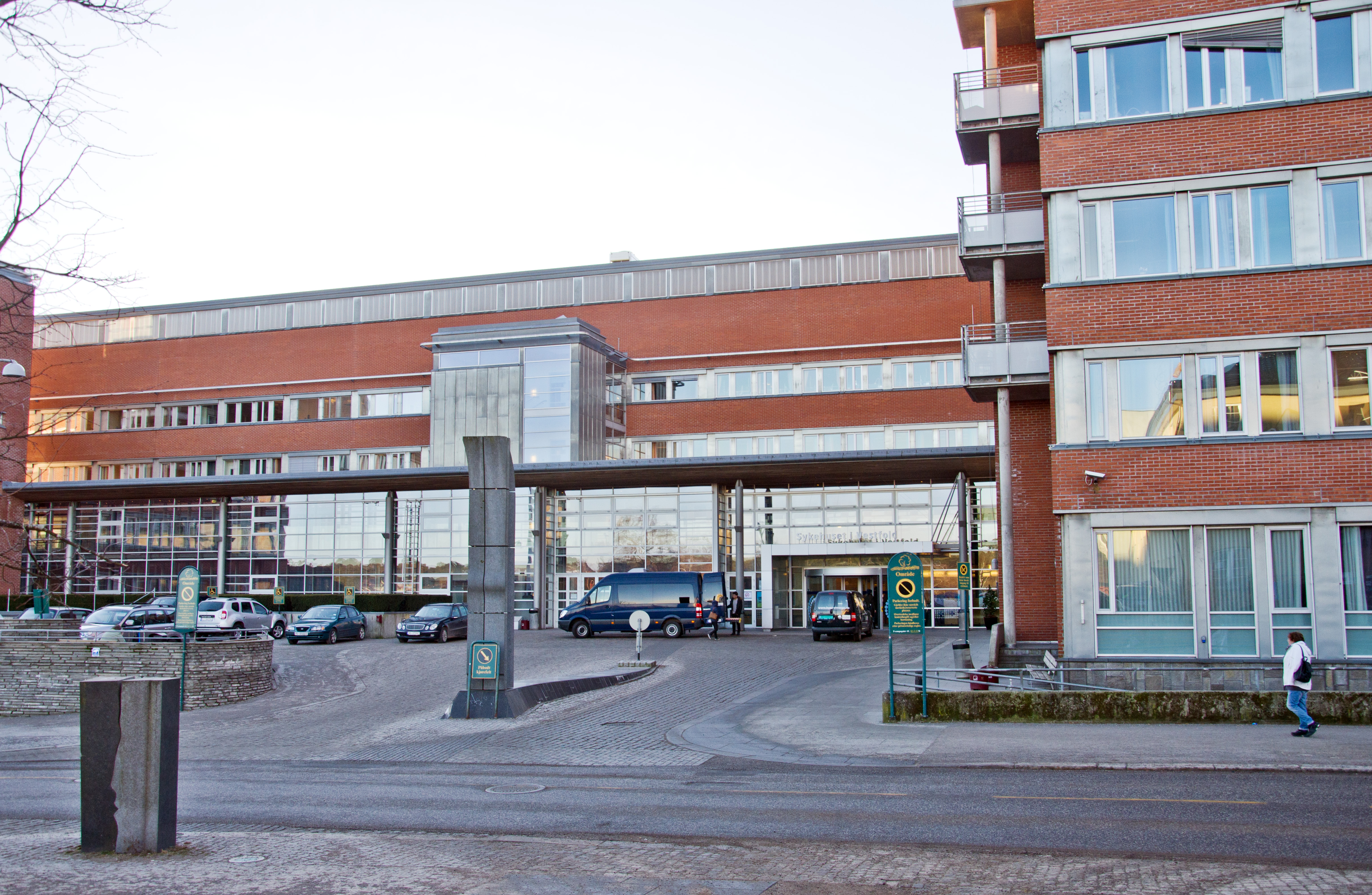
Building H, main entrance

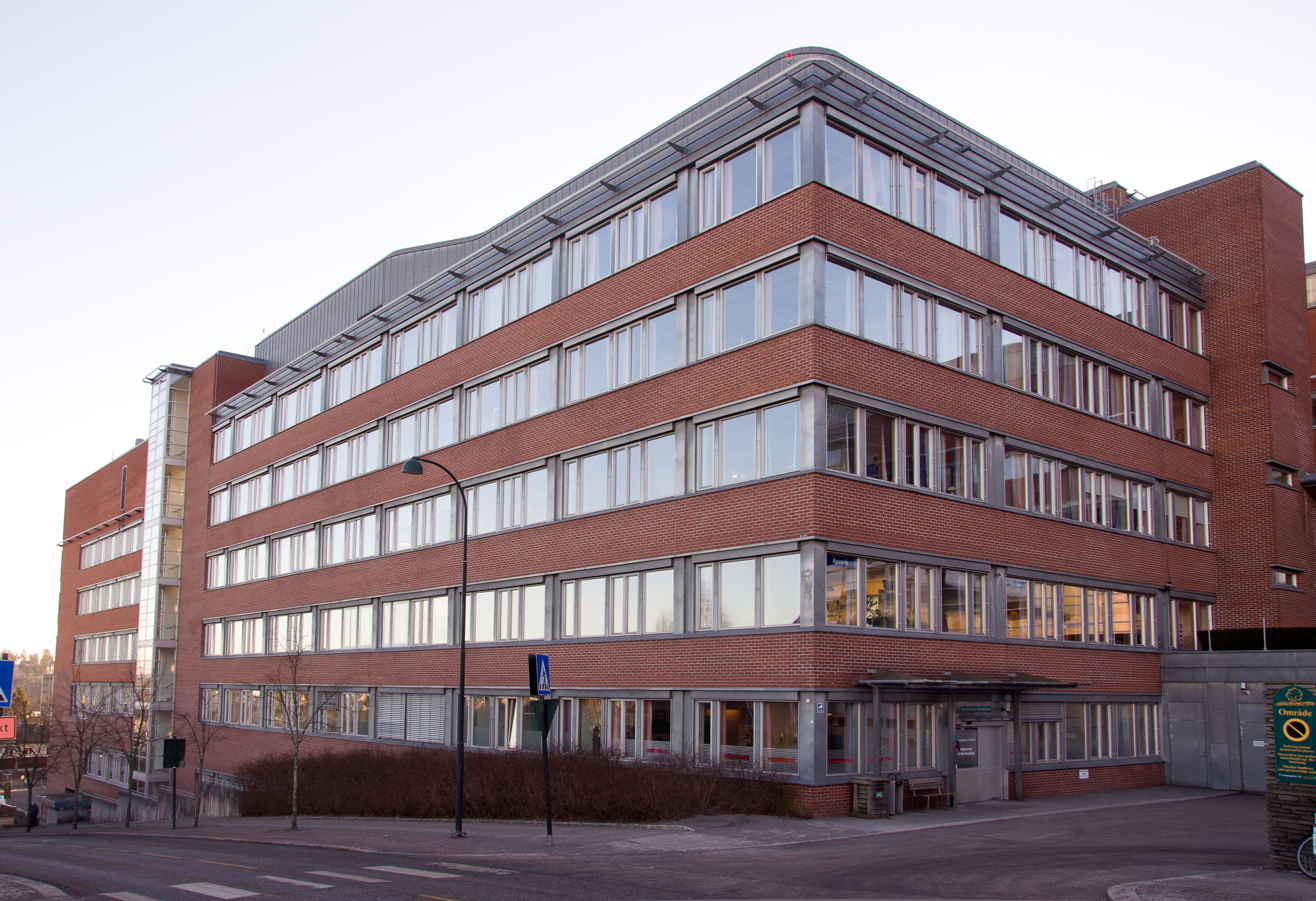
Building L and M

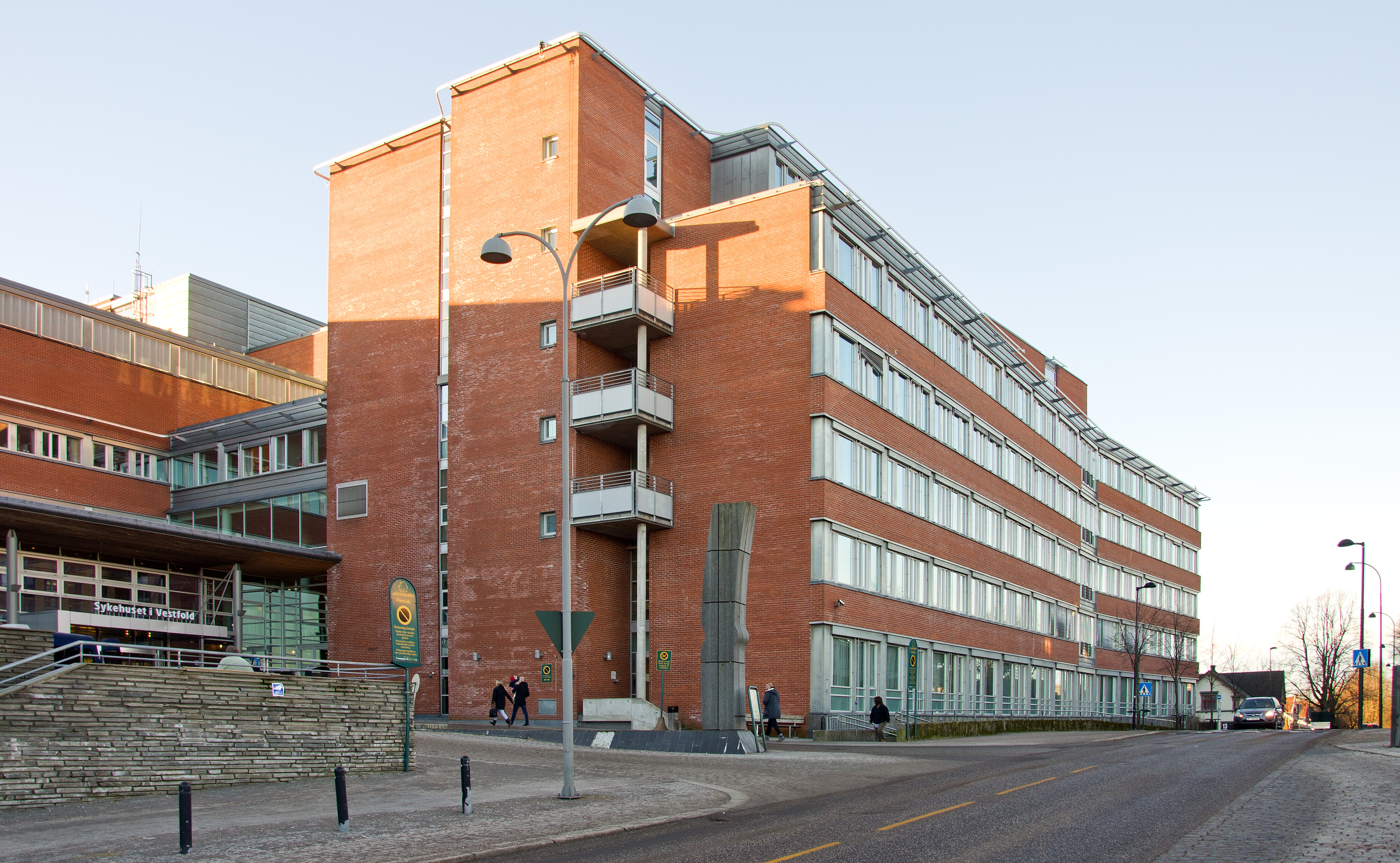
Building C

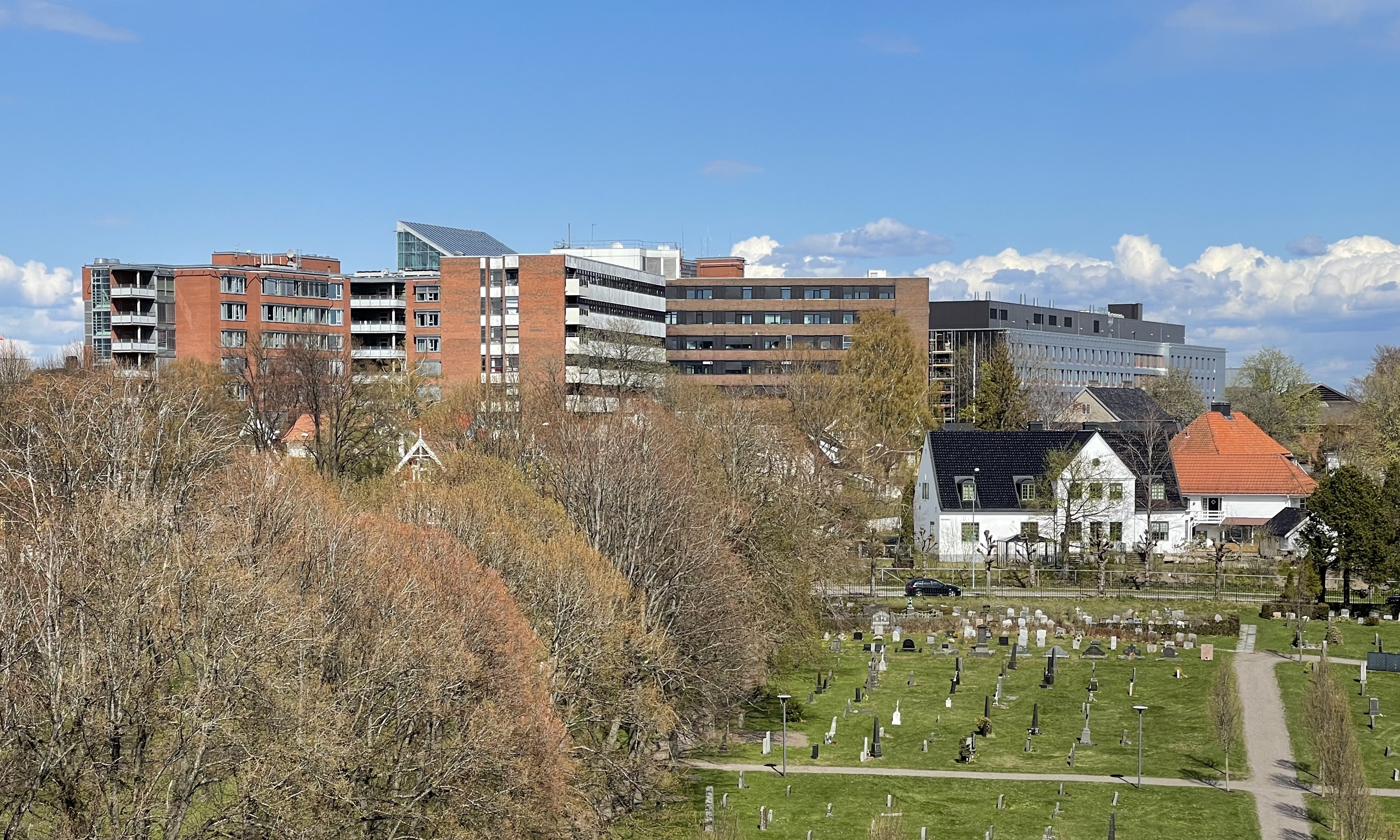
Hospital seen from southwest

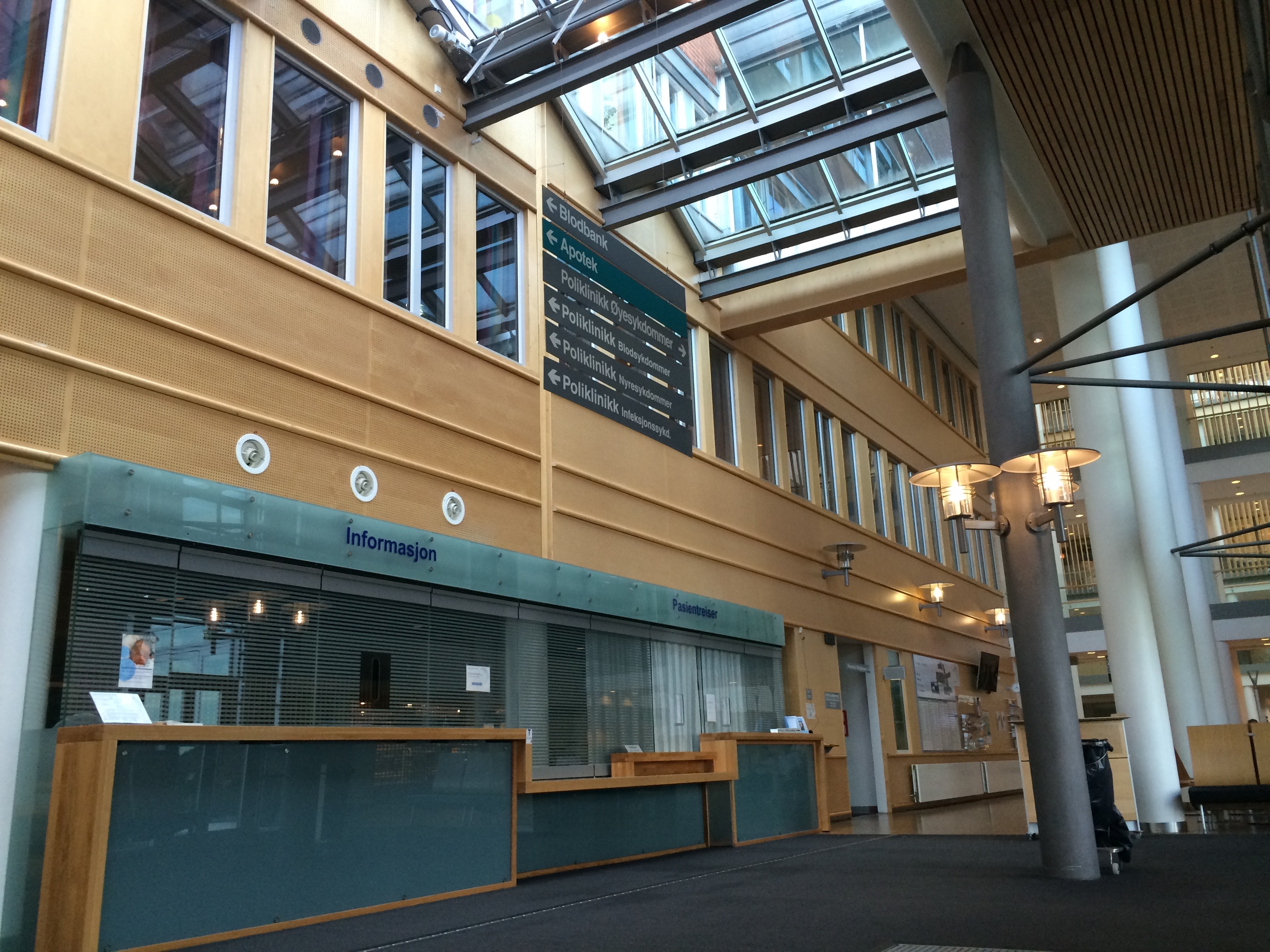
Reception area

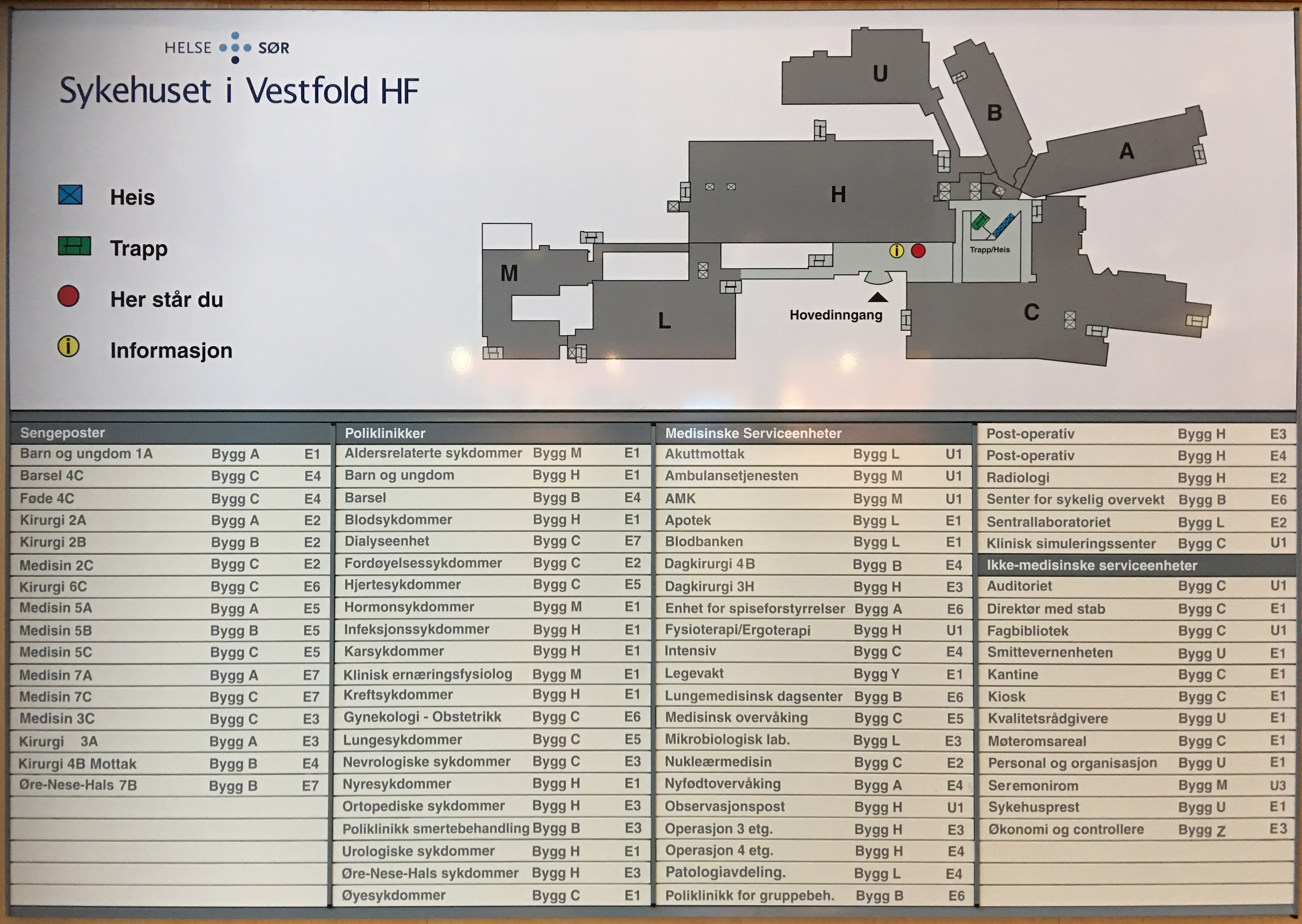
Hospital map prior to the 2021 extension (building A and B has since been demolished)

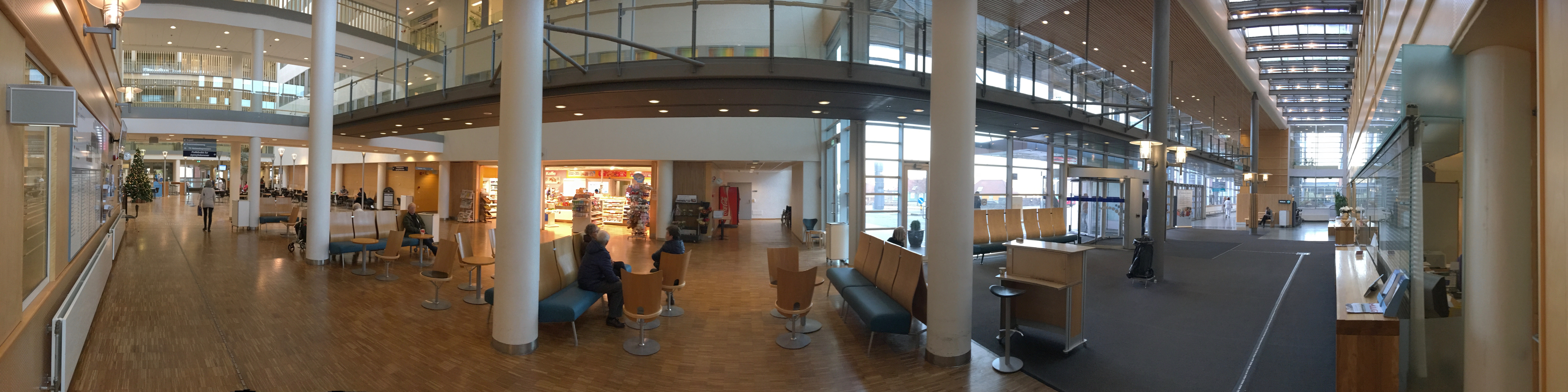
Reception area

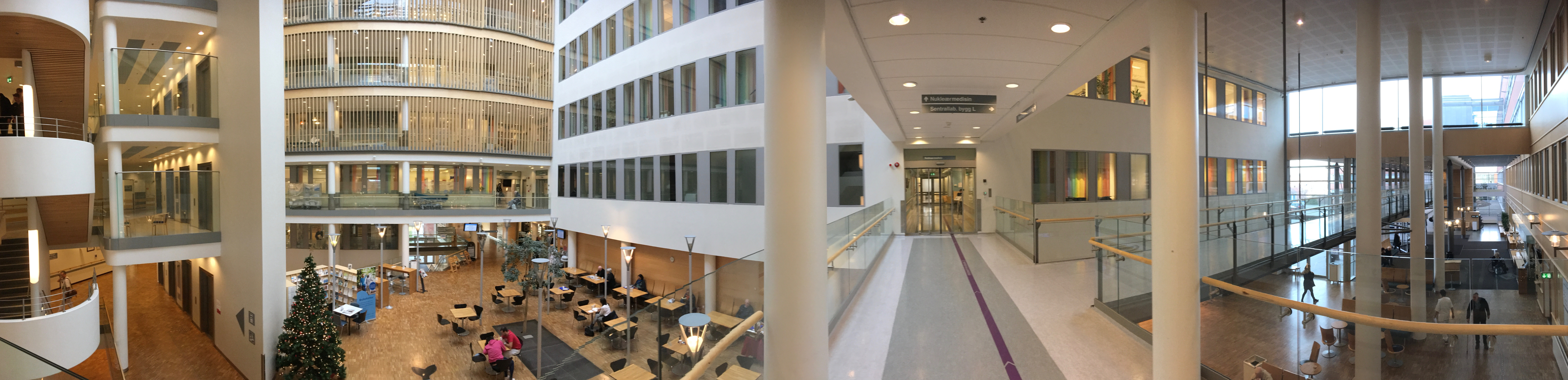
Main common area
