= Lars Haukaas =

Norwegian organizational leader (born 1948)

Lars Haukaas (born 4 November 1948) is a Norwegian organizational leader.

He was born in Oslo, and holds the cand.jur. degree. He worked in Norsk Medisinaldepot from 1983 to 1989, as director in the Norwegian State Railways from 1989 to 1994 and in the employers' association Norwegian Association of Publicly Owned Companies from 1994. In 1995 he was promoted to CEO; the organization has later changed its name to Arbeidsgiverforeningen Spekter. He was also the chair of Ullevål University Hospital from 1996 to 2000.

Preceded by Leif Aune	Chair of Ullevål Hospital; 1996–2000	Succeeded by Karl Glad
