= Psychiatry of Vestfold Trust =

Norwegian health trust

Psychiatry of Vestfold Trust (Psykiatrien i Vestfold HF; PiV) was until 2011 Norway's only health trust which deals solely with psychiatric issues and is based in Vestfold. From 2012 it is a part of Vestfold Hospital.

The psychiatry in Vestfold was separated from Vestfold Hospital in 2000 and is organised in the following sections:

- Nordre Vestfold DPS (formerly Linde and Grefsrud) - based in Tønsberg and Holmestrand.
- Søndre Vestfold DPS (formerly Furubakken and Preståsen) - based in Larvik and Sandefjord.
- Psychiatric medicine. Deals with acute cases, long-term psychiatric treatment, special polyclinics for treatment of ADHD, ECT therapy and help for young people with psychosis.
- Children and young people's psychiatry (BUPA)
- The Vestfold Clinic
- Glenne Centre for autism

The overall head of Psychiatry of Vestfold Trust is currently administrative director Finn Hall.
