= Northern Norway Regional Health Authority =

Norwegian regional health authority

Helse Nord RHF
- Company type: Regional health authority
- Industry: Healthcare
- Founded: 1 January 2002
- Headquarters: Bodø, Norway
- Area served: Northern Norway
- Key people: Marit Lind (CEO); Renate Larsen (Chairman)
- Number of employees: 18,000
- Parent: Norwegian Ministry of Health and Care Services
- Website: helse-nord.no

Northern Norway Regional Health Authority (Norwegian: Helse Nord RHF) is one of four regional health authorities in Norway. It covers the counties of Finnmark, Nordland and Troms. The authority owns six health trusts.

The health trusts owned are Finnmark Hospital Trust, University Hospital of North Norway, Nordland Hospital Trust and Helgeland Hospital Trust as well as Northern Norway Pharmaceutical Trust that operates nineteen pharmacies, and Northern Norway Regional Health Authority ICT Trust.
