= Central Norway Pharmaceutical Trust =

Norwegian health trust

Sykehusapotekene i Midt-Norge HF
- Company type: Health Trust
- Industry: Pharmacy
- Founded: 2002
- Headquarters: Trondheim, Norway
- Area served: Central Norway
- Key people: Gunn Fredriksen (CEO)
- Parent: Central Norway Regional Health Authority
- Website: www.sykehusapoteket.no

Central Norway Pharmaceutical Trust (Norwegian: Sykehusapotekene i Midt-Norge HF) is a health trust owned by Central Norway Regional Health Authority that operates four hospital pharmacies at St. Olavs Hospital in Trondheim, Kristiansund Hospital, Molde Hospital and Ålesund Hospital. The pharmacies are part of the Ditt Apotek chain and use Norsk Medisinaldepot as wholesaler. The hospitals in Levanger, Namsos and Orkanger do not use the trust for their pharmacies.
