= Vitusapotek =

Norwegian pharmacy chain

- Type: Pharmacy
- Industry: Pharmaceutical; Medical; Cosmetic; Dietary
- Founded: 2001
- Number of locations: 300
- Area served: Norway
- Revenue: ▲NOK11 296 064 (2021); NOK 11 024 249(2020)
- Owner: Norsk Medisinaldepot
- Number of employees: 2000
- Website: www.vitusapotek.no

Vitusapotek is a chain of 300 pharmacies in Norway owned and run by NorgesGruppen. The pharmacy chain is based in Oslo, and is the second largest in Norway, after Apotek1.

The chain was established in 2001 after the deregulation of the pharmacy market in Norway. The sister company Ditt Apotek is a franchise chain for independent pharmacies. Until 2007 the chain was a separate company, but is now merged into the parent company along with the wholesaler NMD Grossisthandel. NMD is one of the largest suppliers of pharmaceuticals and health-related products via pharmacies. NMD currently has a distribution center in Oslo and a branch in Harstad.
