= Karl Glad =

Norwegian jurist and industrialist

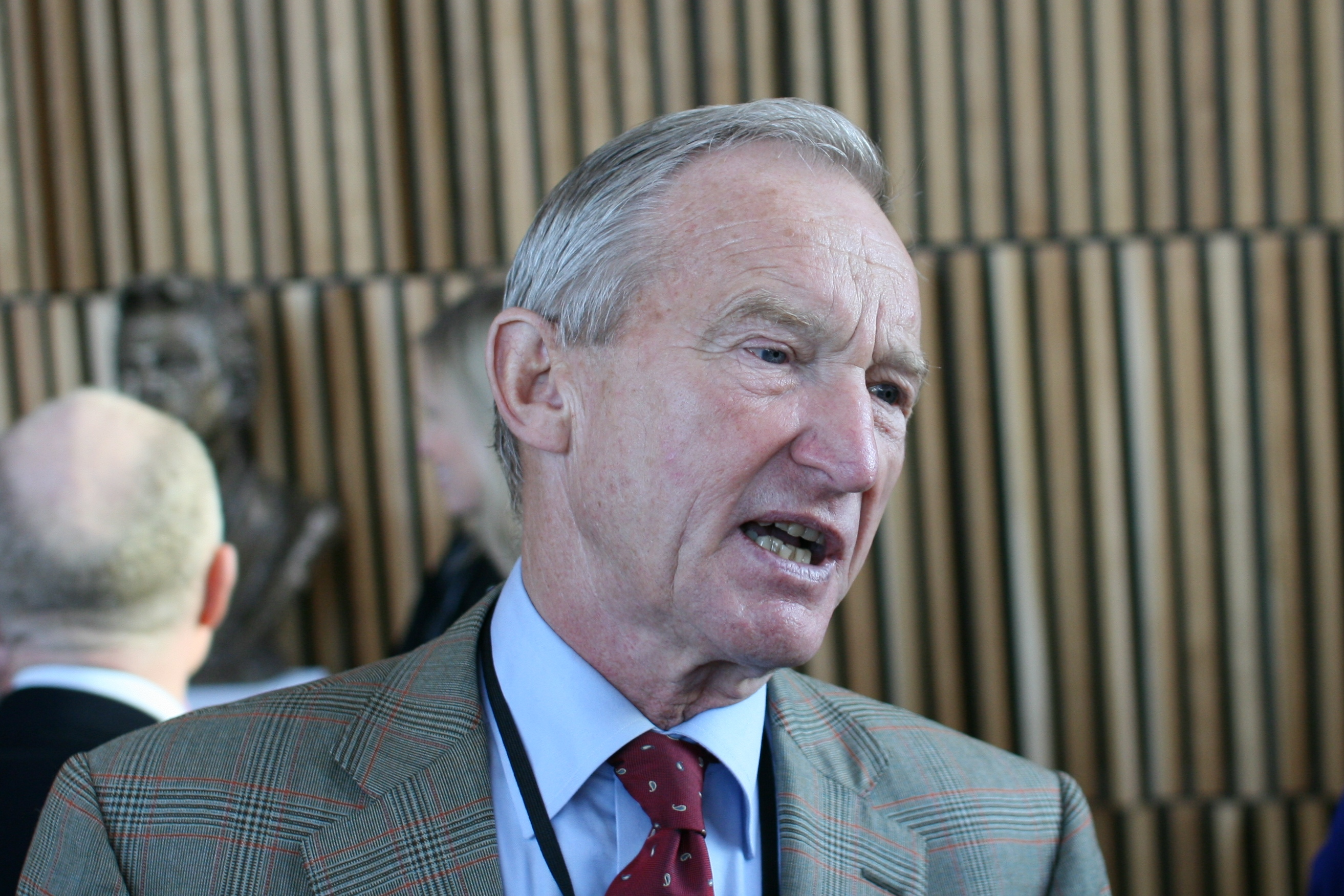
Karl Glad

Karl Glad (born 26 September 1937) is a Norwegian jurist and industrialist. He was born in Oslo. He served as manager of Akergruppen from 1980 to 1987, and CEO of Aker AS from 1989 to 1991. He was manager of the Confederation of Norwegian Enterprise from 1991 to 1999.

| Preceded by Lars Haukaas | Chair of Ullevål Hospital; February 2000 – October 2000 | Succeeded by Ingar Pettersen |
