= Western Norway Pharmaceutical Trust =

Norwegian health trust

Apotekene Vest HF
- Type: Health Trust
- Industry: Pharmacy
- Founded: 2002
- Headquarters: Bergen, Norway
- Area served: Western Norway
- Parent: Western Norway Regional Health Authority
- Website: apotekene-vest.no

Western Norway Pharmaceutical Trust (Norwegian: Apotekene Vest HF) is a health trust owned by Western Norway Regional Health Authority that operates four hospital pharmacies at Haukeland University Hospital in Bergen, Stavanger Hospital, Haugesund Hospital and Førde Hospital. The pharmacies are part of the Ditt Apotek chain and use Norsk Medisinaldepot as wholesaler.
