= Tønsberg Hospital =

- Vestfold Hospital Trust
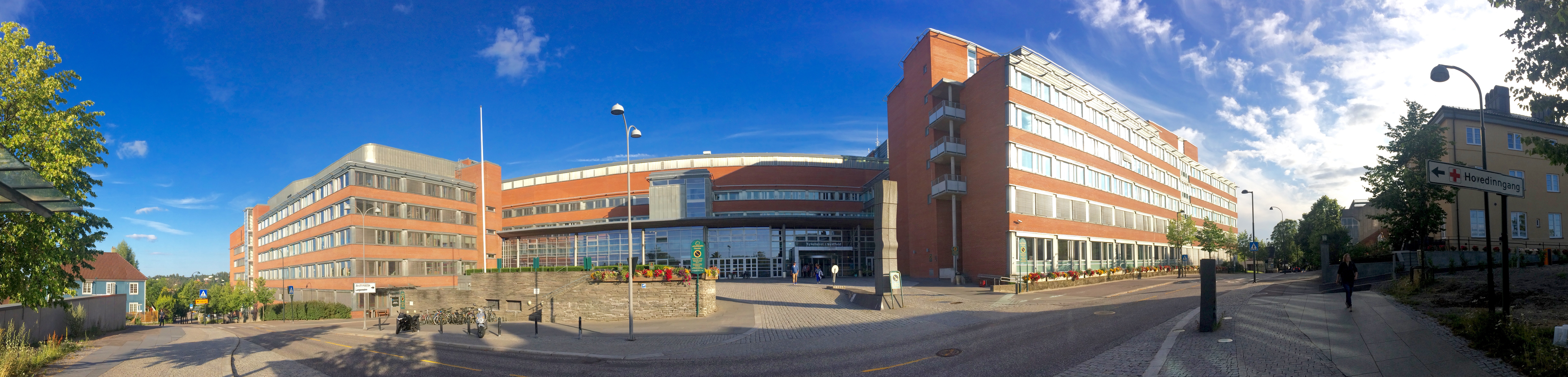
- Tønsberg Hospital in 2015.

- Location in Norway

Geography
- Location: Tønsberg, Norway
- Coordinates: 59.27242°N 10.41756°E

Organisation
- Type: General

Services
- Emergency department: Yes

Helipads
- Helipad: Yes

Links
- Website: siv.no

Tønsberg Hospital (Norwegian: Tønsberg sykehus) is a general hospital situated in Tønsberg, Vestfold, Norway. It is the main facility of Vestfold Hospital Trust, part of the Southern and Eastern Norway Regional Health Authority.

Tønsberg Heliport, Hospital is an asphalt, ground helipad with a diameter of 18.3 meters (60 ft). A new parking garage and is under construction and will receive the a new helipad on top. Until this is completed the Westland Sea King helicopters use the city's fire department to land.

== Gallery ==
Tønsberg Hospital

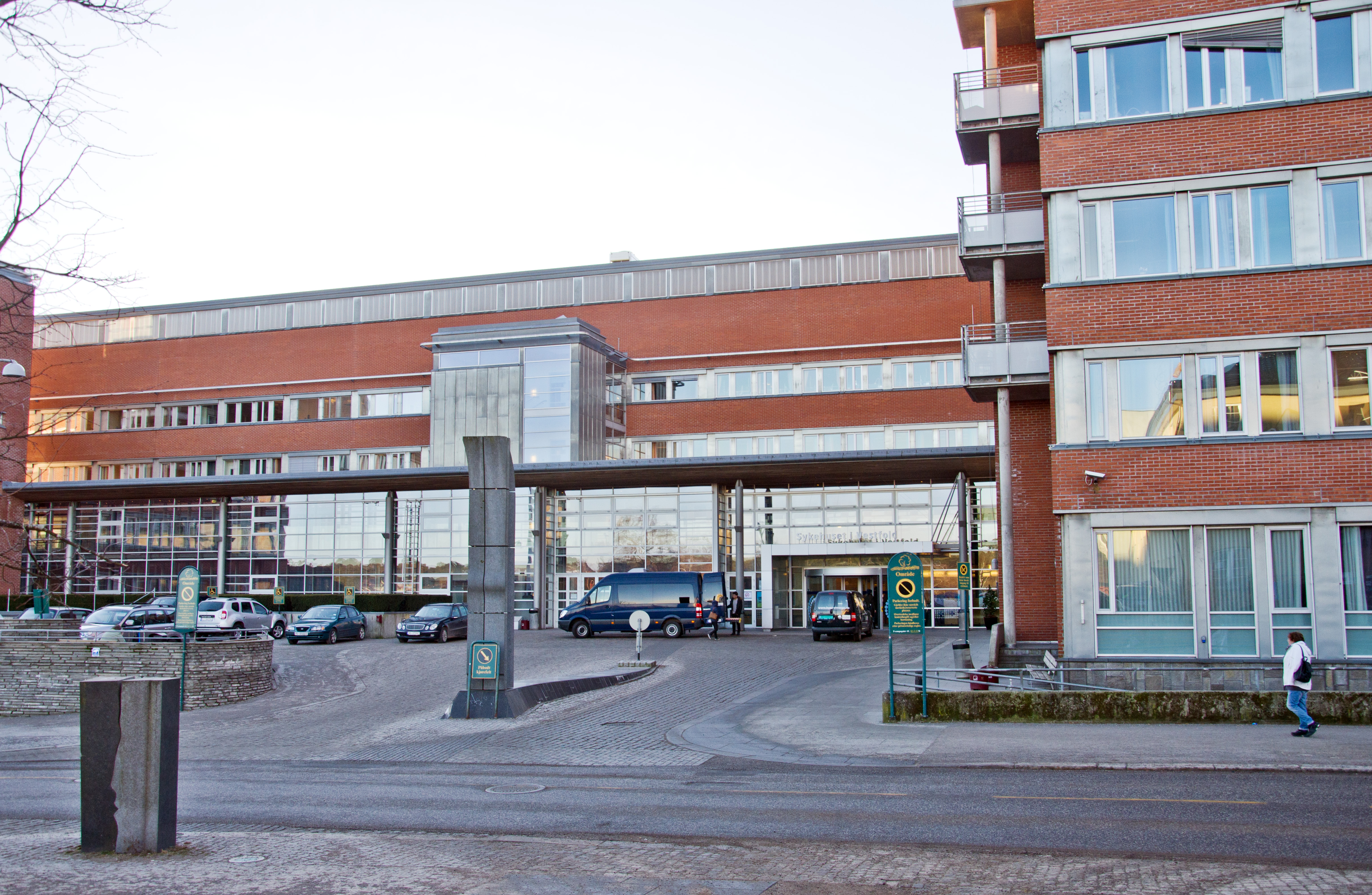
Building H, main entrance

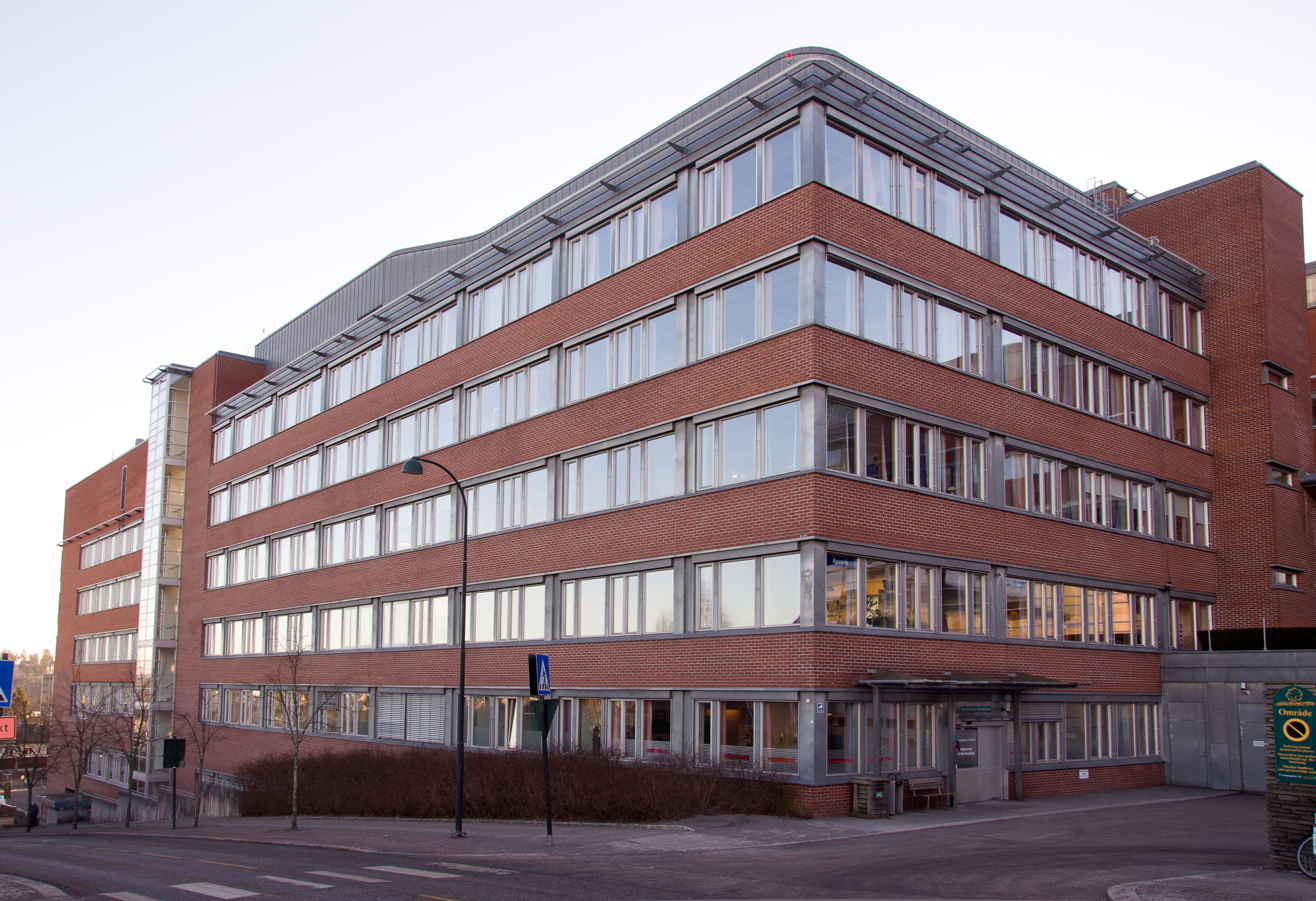
Building L and M

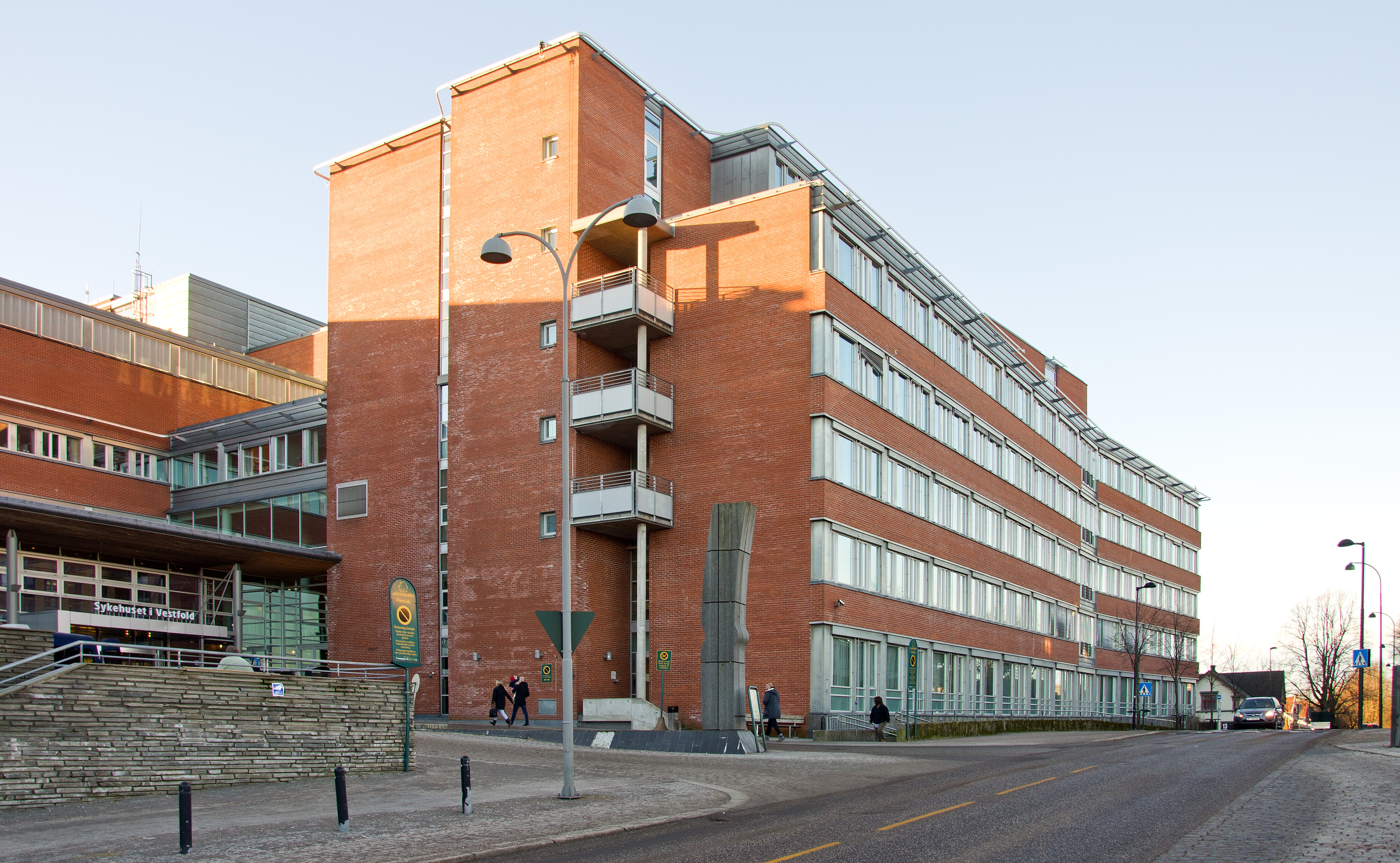
Building C

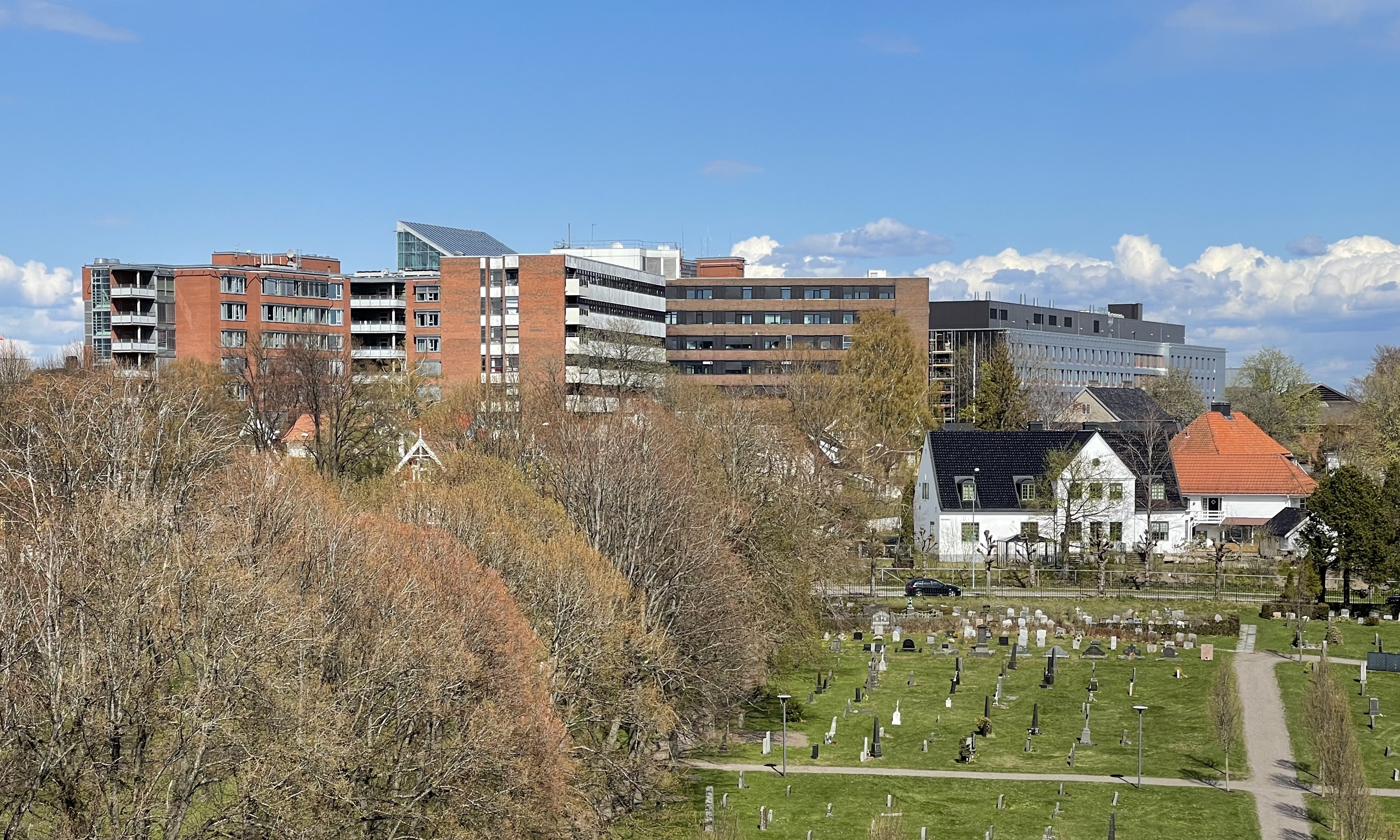
Hospital seen from southwest

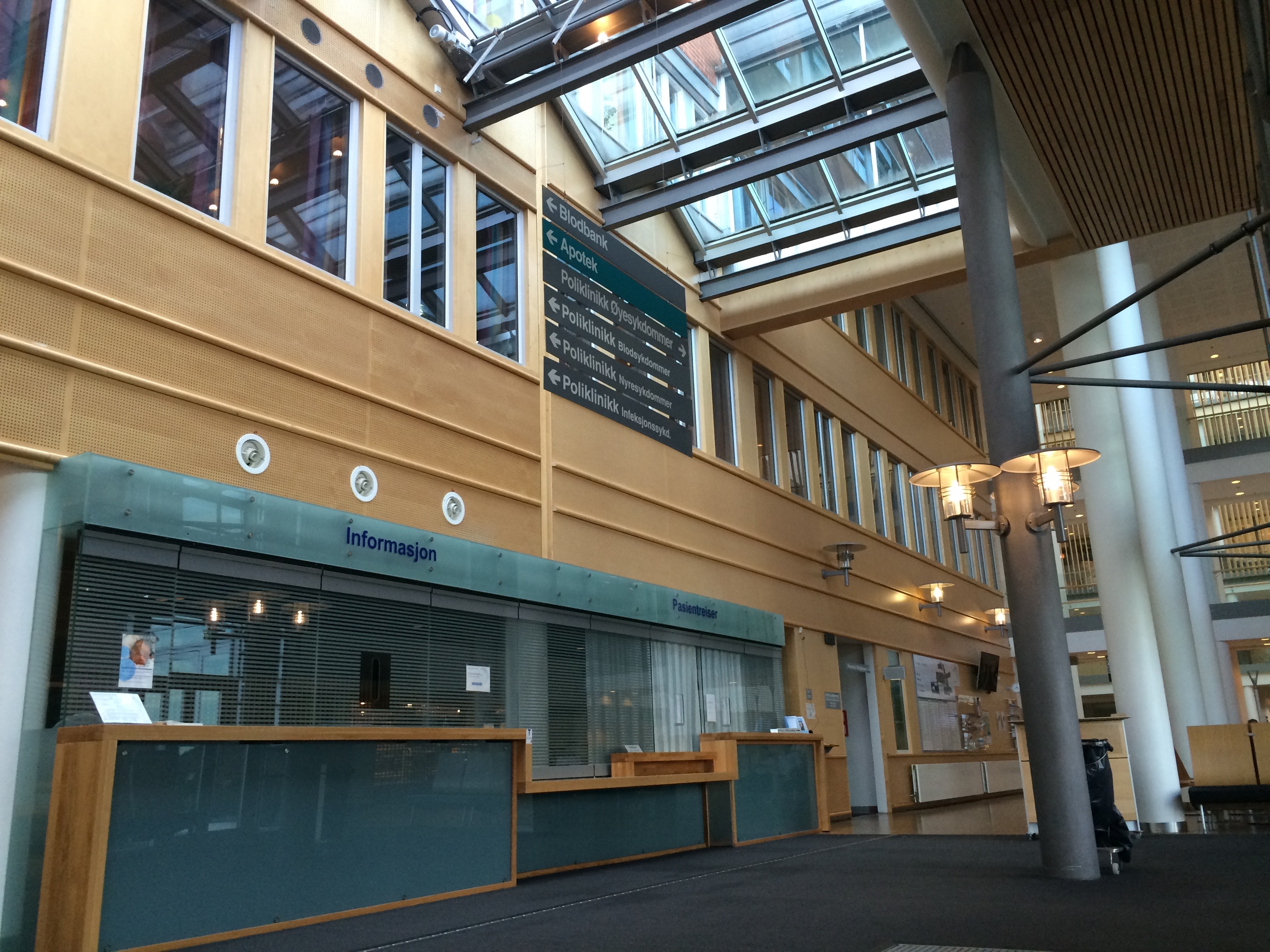
Reception area

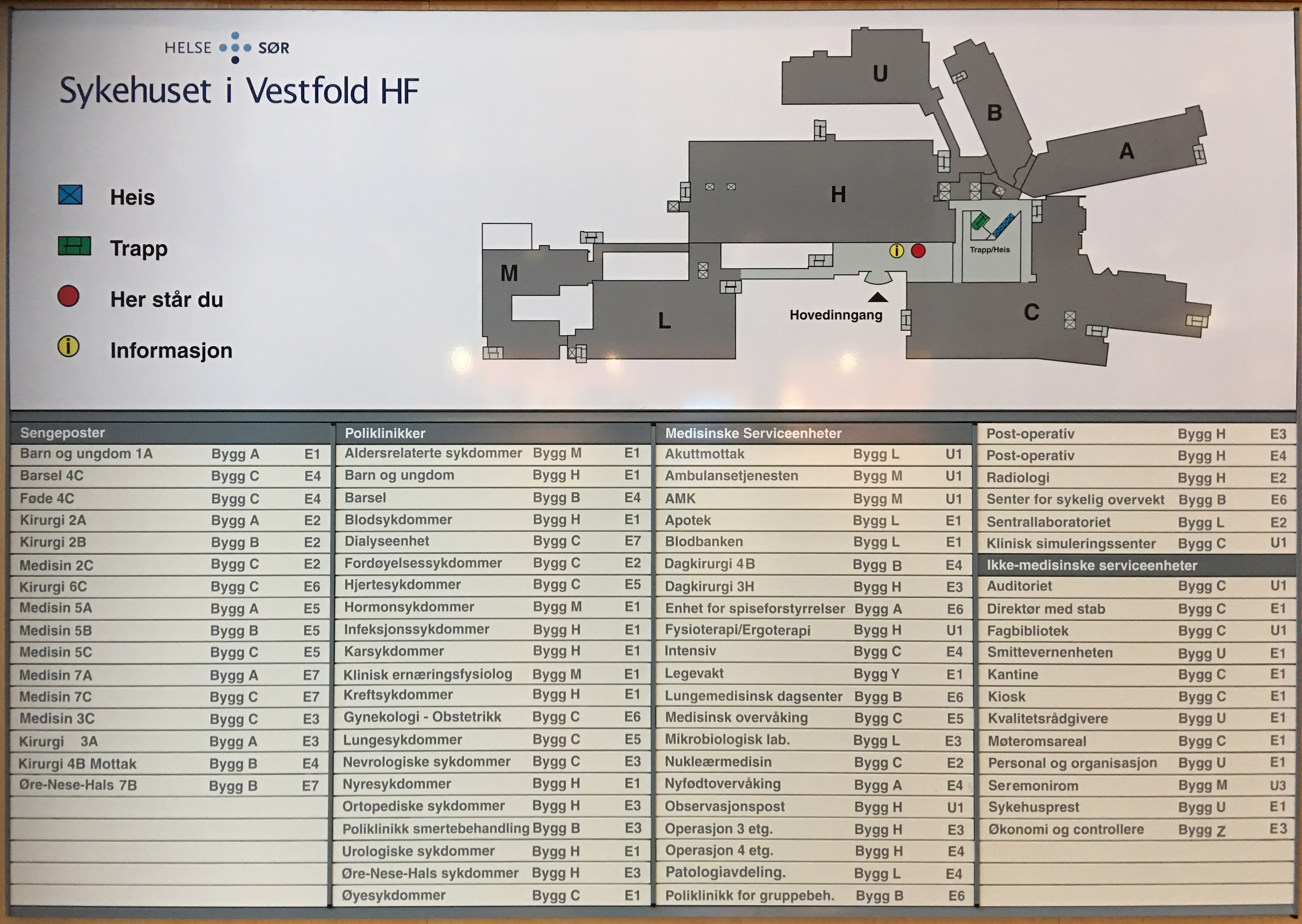
Hospital map prior to the 2021 extension (building A and B has since been demolished)

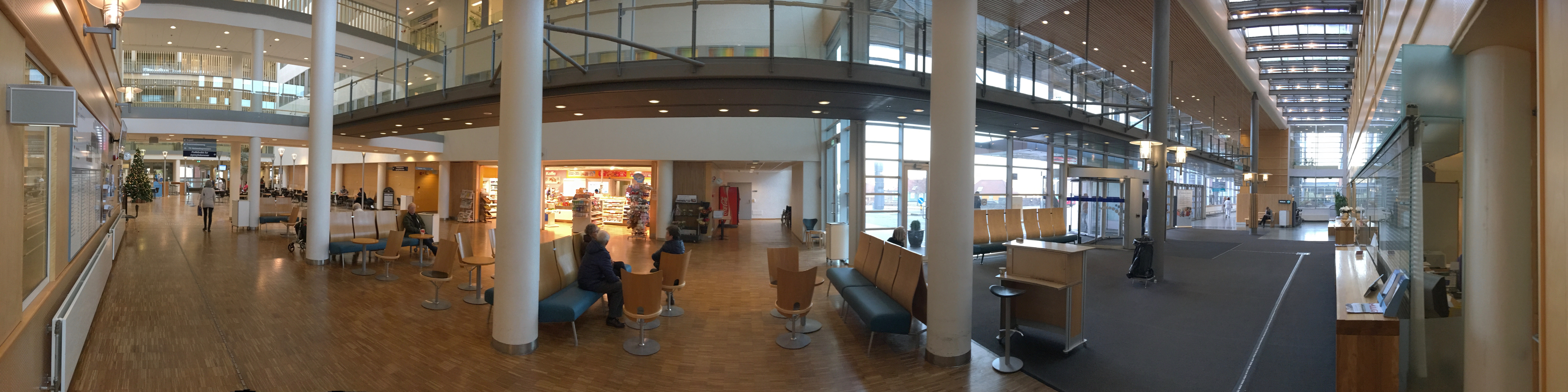
Reception area

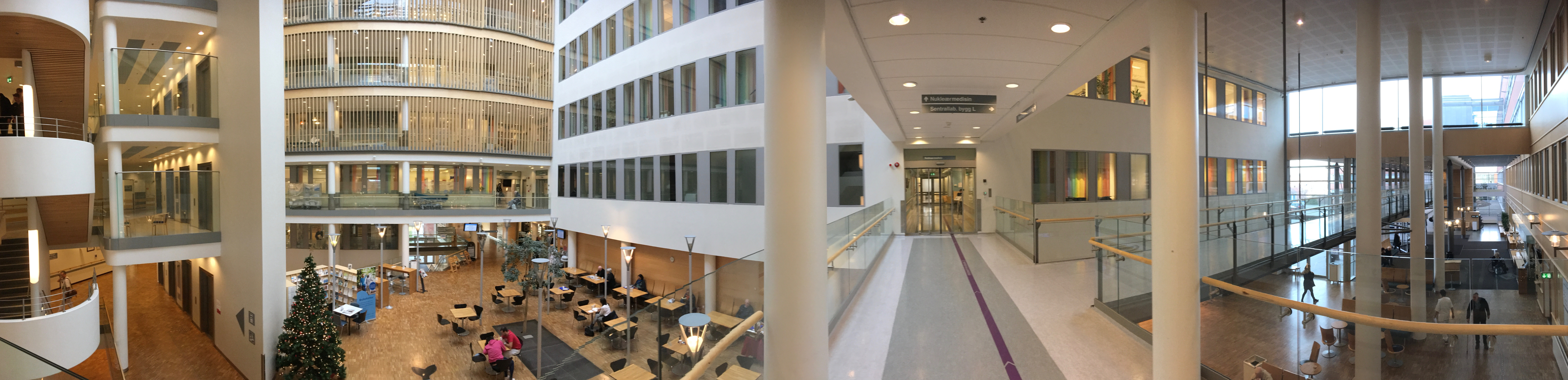
Main common area

== Notable births ==
- Magnus Carlsen, chess grandmaster and World Chess Champion
