= Levanger Hospital =

- Nord-Trøndelag Hospital Trust
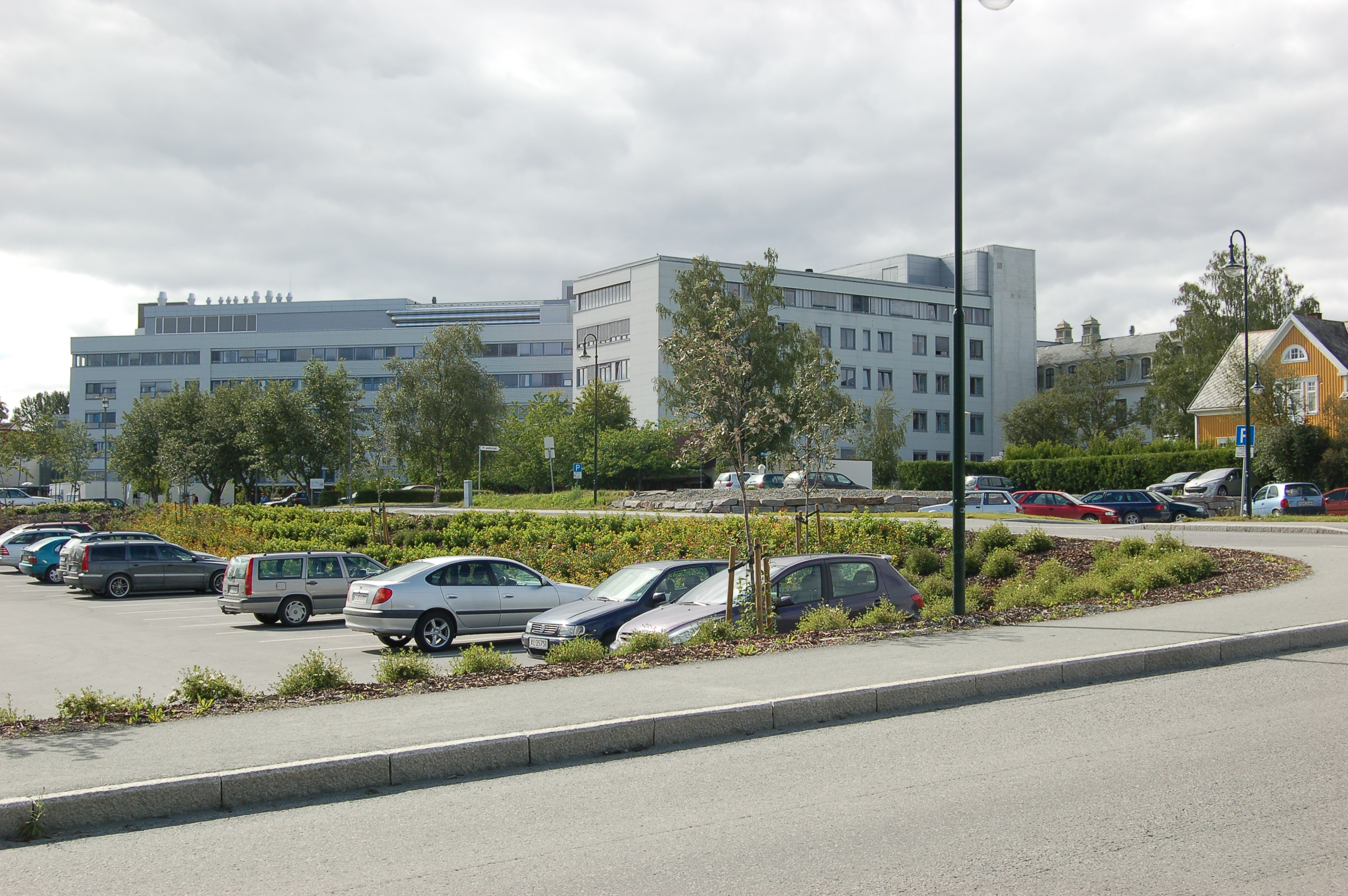
- Levanger Hospital

Geography
- Location: Levanger, Levanger Municipality, Trøndelag county, Norway
- Coordinates: 63.74°N 11.28°E

Organisation
- Type: General

History
- Former names: Nordre Trondhjems Amts Sygehus på Eidesøren, Innherred sykehus
- Opened: 1844

Links
- Lists: Hospitals in Norway

Levanger Hospital (Norwegian: Sykehuset Levanger) is a hospital located in the town of Levanger in Levanger Municipality in Trøndelag county, Norway. The hospital is located along the road Kirkegata on the west side of the town of Levanger.

Along with Namsos Hospital, this is one of two hospitals in the old Nord-Trøndelag county (now part of Trøndelag county). Both hospitals are managed by the Nord-Trøndelag Hospital Trust. Levanger Hospital generally serves the southern and central parts of northern Trøndelag county.

== History ==
The decision to build the hospital was made in 1840, and it was opened in 1844. On 1 April 1844, Peter Wilhelm Kreidahl Dietrichson was appointed as the chief physician of the hospital. Former names for the hospital are Nordre Trondhjems Amts Sygehus på Eidesøren (lit. 'North Trondheim county's hospital at Eidesøren') and Innherred sykehus (lit. 'Innherred Hospital'), the latter name was used until 2002.
