= Ditt Apotek =

Norwegian pharmacy chain

- Company type: Pharmacy
- Founded: 2001
- Number of locations: 80
- Area served: Norway
- Owner: Norsk Medisinaldepot
- Website: www.dittapotek.no

Ditt Apotek is a chain of 80 pharmacies owned and run by independent pharmacists on franchise from Norsk Medisinaldepot, a subsidiary of McKesson Europe. The chain is the fourth largest, and thus smallest, in Norway. The chain was established in 2001 after the deregulation of the pharmacy market in Norway. The sister company Vitusapotek operates 133 pharmacies owned by the mother company.

Among the members are the four state owned pharmaceutical trusts that operate the pharmacies at the hospitals: Southern and Eastern Norway Pharmaceutical Trust, Western Norway Pharmaceutical Trust, Central Norway Pharmaceutical Trust, and Northern Norway Pharmaceutical Trust.

In August 2025 it was announced that NorgesGruppen was acquiring Norsk Medisinaldepot from McKesson.
