= Oslo University Hospital, Aker =

Aker University Hospital
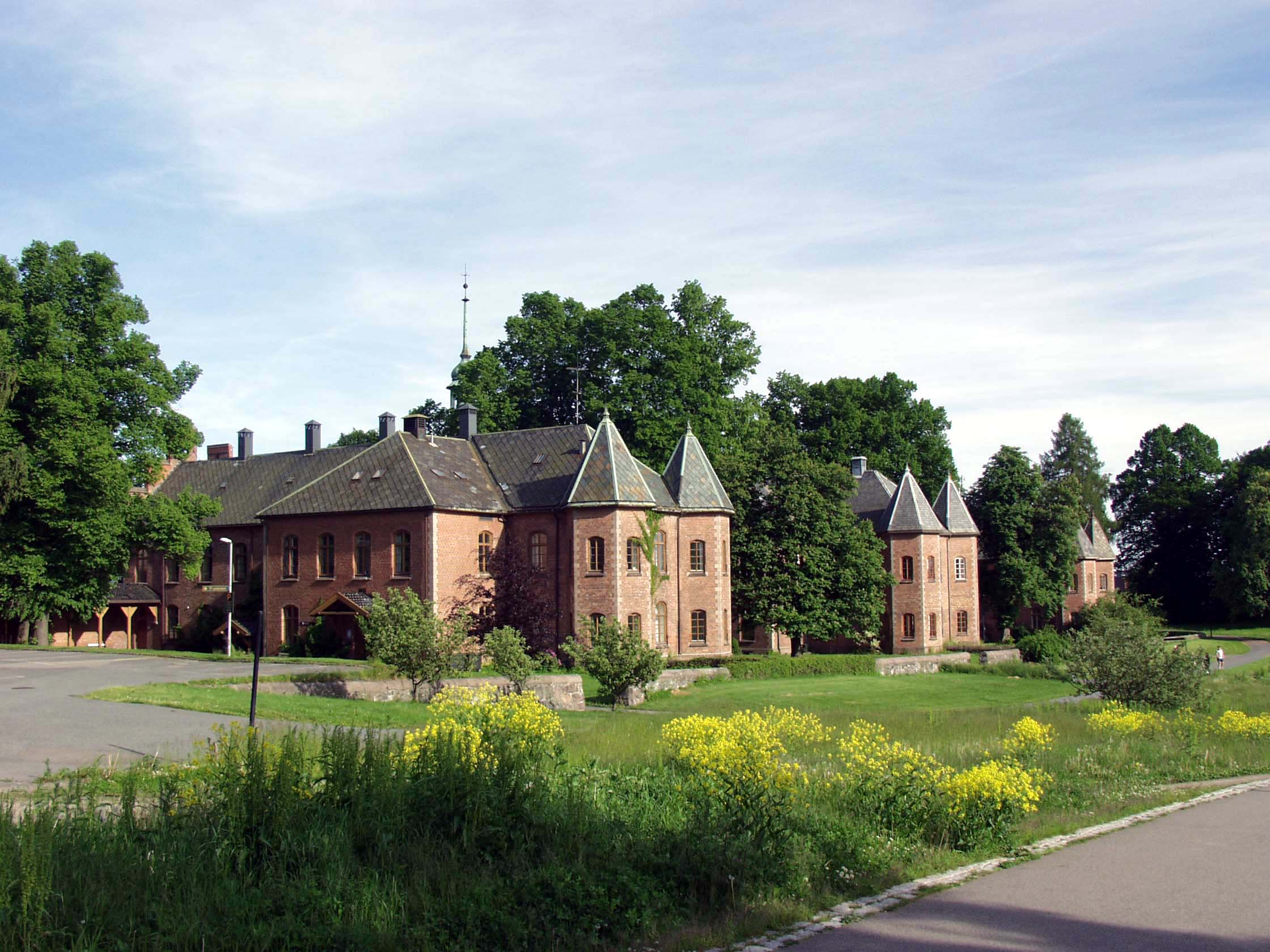

Geography
- Location: Oslo, Norway
- Coordinates: 59°56′21.76″N 10°47′45.89″E

Organisation
- Affiliated university: Oslo University Hospital

History
- Founded: 1895

Links
- Website: www.akersykehus.no
- Lists: Hospitals in Norway

Oslo University Hospital, Aker (also known as Aker Hospital or just Aker) is one of the four main campuses of Oslo University Hospital. It was an independent hospital from 1895 to 2009, under the name Aker Hospital and from 2002 Aker University Hospital. Originally established as the municipal hospital of Aker, the hospital became a university hospital affiliated with the University of Oslo in 1948.

== History ==
Former logo of Aker University Hospital

Aker Hospital was founded as a municipal hospital in the municipality of Aker in 1895. Aker municipality was merged with Oslo in 1948; in the same year Aker Hospital became a university hospital affiliated with the University of Oslo. The hospital was owned by the Oslo city government from 1948 to 2002, when it was transferred to the national government along with Ullevål Hospital.

Since January 2002, the hospital was organized as a government-owned health trust and the hospital was renamed Aker University Hospital to reflect its status as a university hospital.

The hospital was responsible for providing health care to 170,000 people residing in the northern part of Oslo as well as the municipalities of Ski, Oppegård, Nesodden, Frogn, Ås and Vestby. It also served as a regional hospital for Norway's Health Region East, which includes Oslo, Hedmark, Oppland, Akershus and Østfold counties with a total population of 1.6 million.
