= Namsos Hospital =

- Nord-Trøndelag Hospital Trust
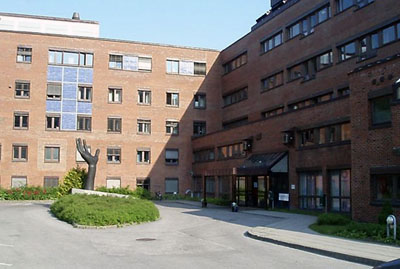

Geography
- Location: Namsos, Norway
- Coordinates: 64.470870°N 11.505175°E

Organisation
- Care system: Public
- Type: General

Services
- Emergency department: Yes

Helipads
- Helipad: ICAO: ENNH

Links
- Lists: Hospitals in Norway

Namsos Hospital (Norwegian: Sykehuset Namsos) is a local hospital located in the town of Namsos in Namsos Municipality in Trøndelag county, Norway. Owned and operated by Nord-Trøndelag Hospital Trust, part of the Central Norway Regional Health Authority, it serves the district of Namdalen in northern Trøndelag county plus Osen Municipality (south of Namdalen) and Bindal Municipality (in Nordland county).

Namsos Heliport, Hospital (ICAO: ENNH) is situated 100 meters (330 ft) from the emergency department. The helipad measures 20 by 20 meters (66 by 66 ft).
