= Apotekernes Fællesindkjøp =

Norwegian wholesaler

A/S Apotekernes Fællesindkjøp
- Industry: Wholesaler
- Founded: 1913
- Defunct: 1992
- Fate: Acquisition
- Successor: Norsk Medisinaldepot
- Headquarters: Oslo, Norway
- Products: Healthcare products

Apotekernes Fællesindkjøp was a Norwegian wholesaler company owned by the pharmacies that provided them with healthcare products. The company was bought in 1992 by the state owned Norsk Medisinaldepot who at the time was the sole wholesaler of pharmaceuticals in the country.
