= Nordland Hospital Trust =

Norwegian hospital trust

Coordinates: 67°16′57″N 14°23′48″E

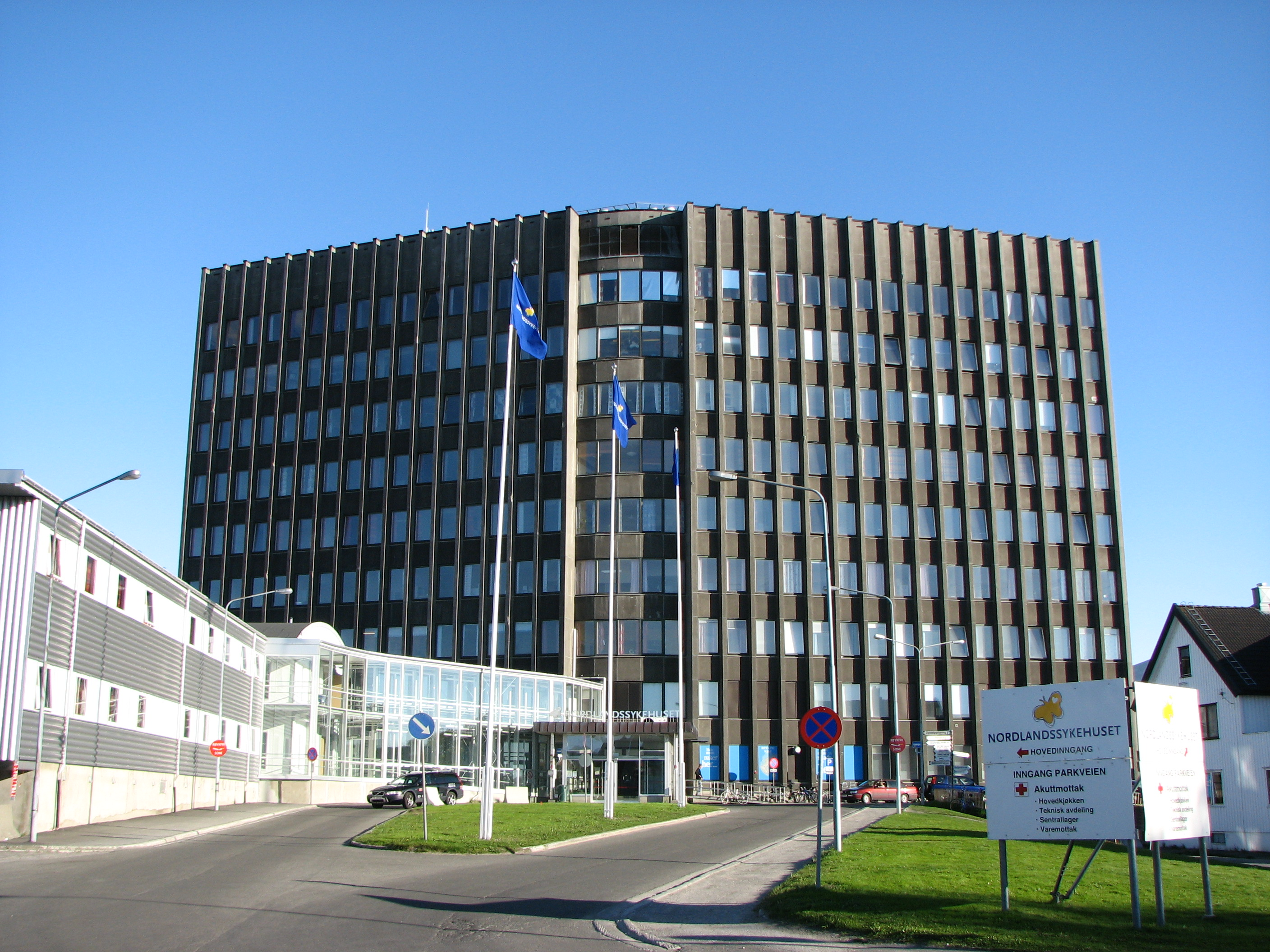
Nordland Hospital, Bodø center

Nordland Hospital Trust (Norwegian: Nordlandssykehuset HF, NLSH) is a part of the Northern Norway Regional Health Authority and covers the specialist health services for areas in Nordland county located north of the Saltfjellet district. The trust consists of a number of units that were merged on 1 January 2002, following law that transferred authority over healthcare services from the county to the national government. In addition, the trust manages several minor psychiatric treatment facilities in the county. Eivind Solheim was managing director of the trust until 2010.

The trust consists of four previously independent hospitals, including:

- Nordland Hospital Bodø, a medical hospital in Bodø (Bodø Municipality), previously known as "Nordland Central Hospital"
- Nordland Hospital Rønvik, a psychiatric hospital in Bodø (Bodø Municipality), previously known as "Nordland Psychiatric Hospital"
- Nordland Hospital Lofoten, a medical hospital in Gravdal (Vestvågøy Municipality), previously known as "Lofoten Hospital"
- Nordland Hospital Vesterålen, a medical hospital in Stokmarknes (Hadsel Municipality), previously known as "Hålogaland Hospital"
