= Hospital pharmacy =

Dispensary within a hospital

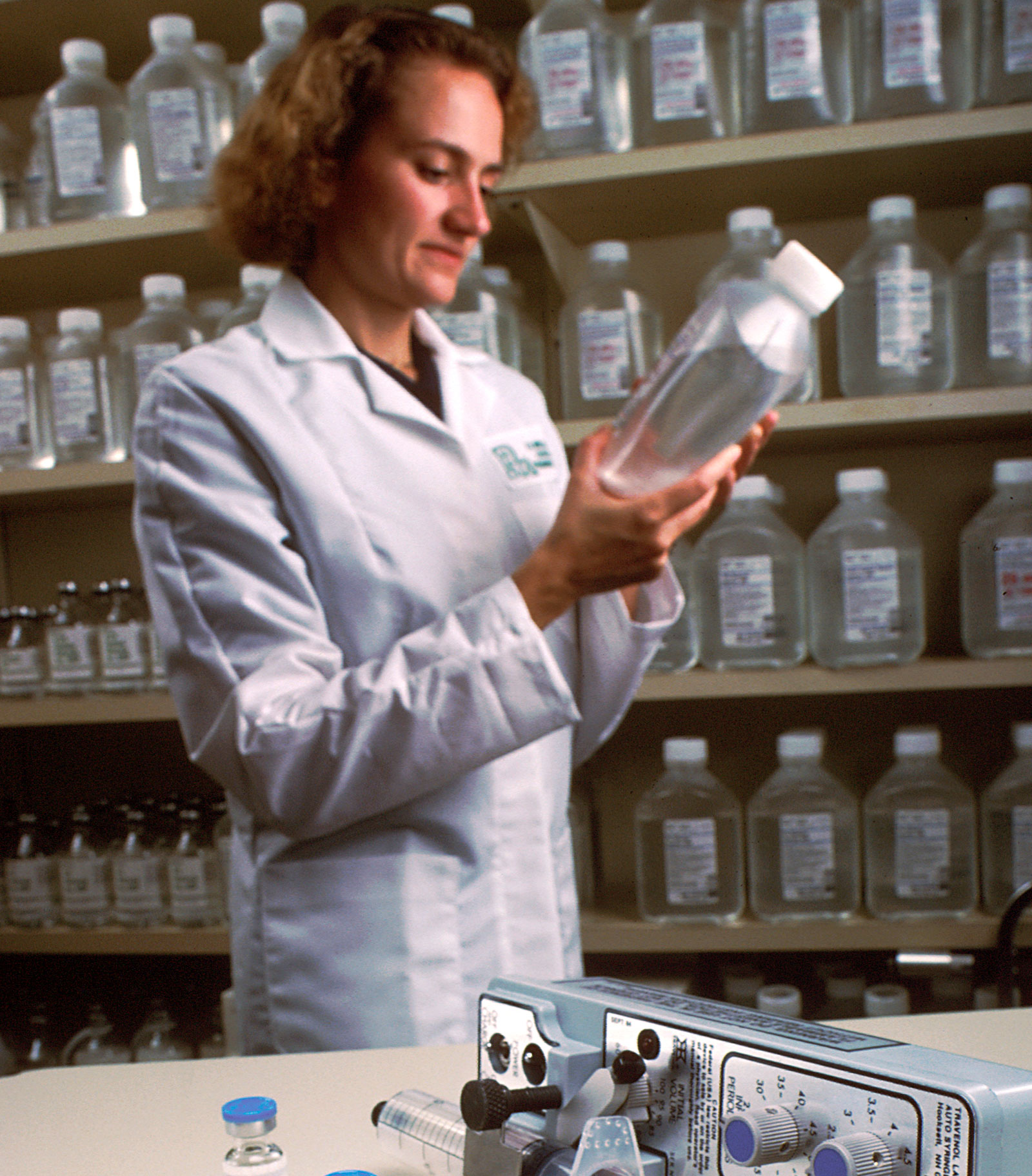
A hospital pharmacist checking a liquid solution.

A hospital pharmacy is a department within a hospital that prepares, compounds, stocks and dispenses inpatient medications. Hospital pharmacies usually stock a larger range of medications, including more specialized and investigational medications (medicines that are being studied, but have not yet been approved), than would be feasible in the community setting. Hospital pharmacies may also dispense over-the-counter and prescription medications to outpatients.

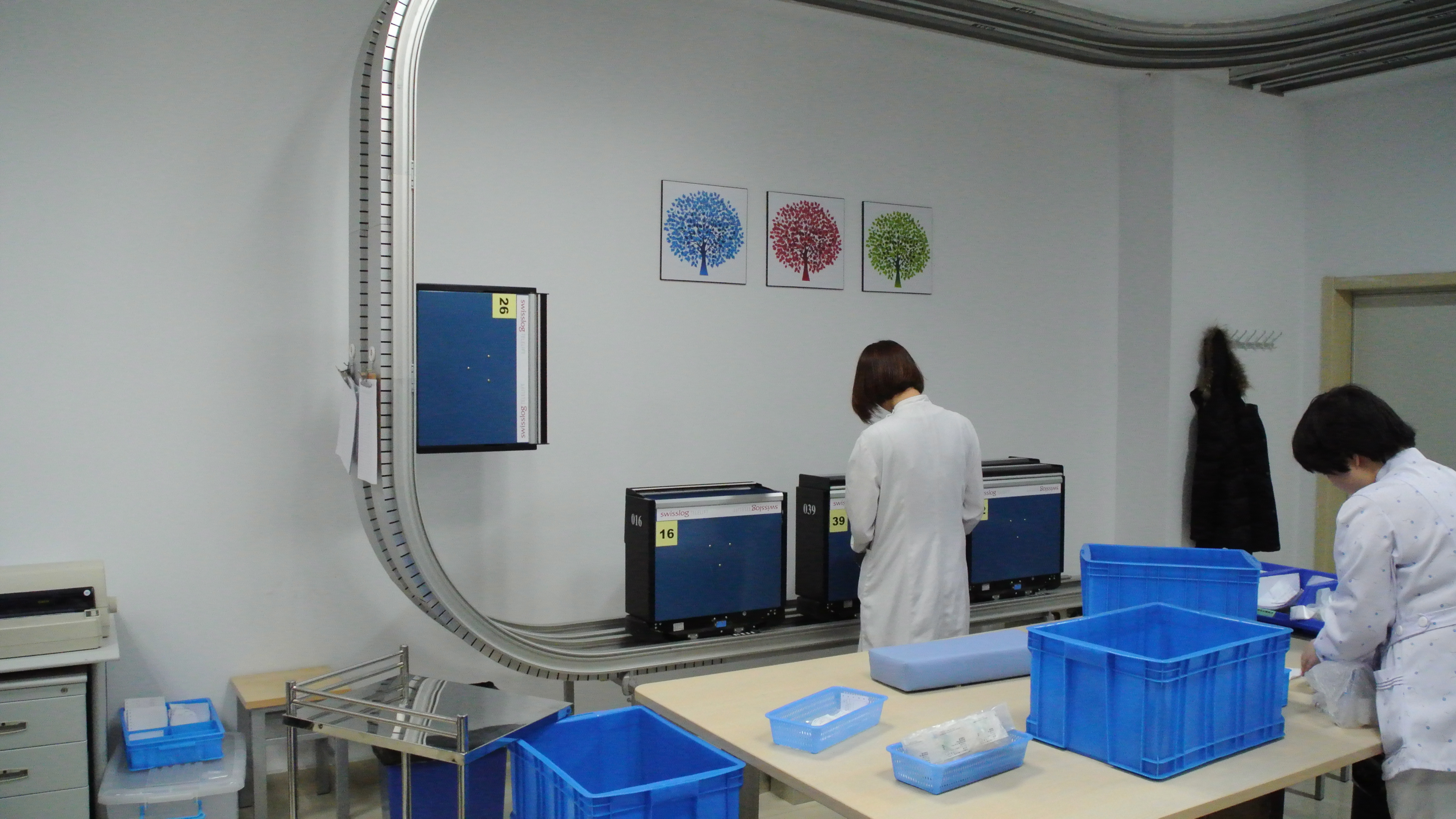
Electric track vehicle system for hospitals, type Telelift

Hospital pharmacies may provide a huge quantity of medications per day which is allocated to the wards and to intensive care units according to a patient's medication schedule. Larger hospitals may use automated transport systems to aid in the efficient distribution of medications.

Hospital pharmacists and trained pharmacy technicians compound sterile products for patients such as total parenteral nutrition (TPN) and other medications given intravenously such as neonatal antibiotics and chemotherapy. Some hospital pharmacies may outsource high-risk preparations and some other compounding functions to companies that specialize in compounding.

Hospital pharmacists often report an interest in undertaking research, although identify barriers to doing so during routine practice. Many hospital pharmacists actively participating in research also have university affiliations.

Hospital pharmacists provide services to people admitted to hospitals as in-patients. The services provided include ensuring appropriate therapies are identified and in reducing medication errors. These services may be pharmacist-led interventions or part of interdisciplinary teams. They may further organise for medication reviews post-discharge. These services may be provided in person or via telehealth.

In the United States, hospital pharmacy was not a significant practice until the 1920s. In the 18th and 19th centuries, the medicine and pharmacy were commonly one practice, in which a medical apprentice would be responsible for the drug preparation..

Hospital pharmacists often require additional education support and professional development to develop advanced skills and specialisation. Many health services require junior pharmacists to undertake pharmacy residencies for skill development.

== See also ==
- Clinical pharmacy
- Pharmacy
