= Apotek 1 =

Pharmacy chain in Norway

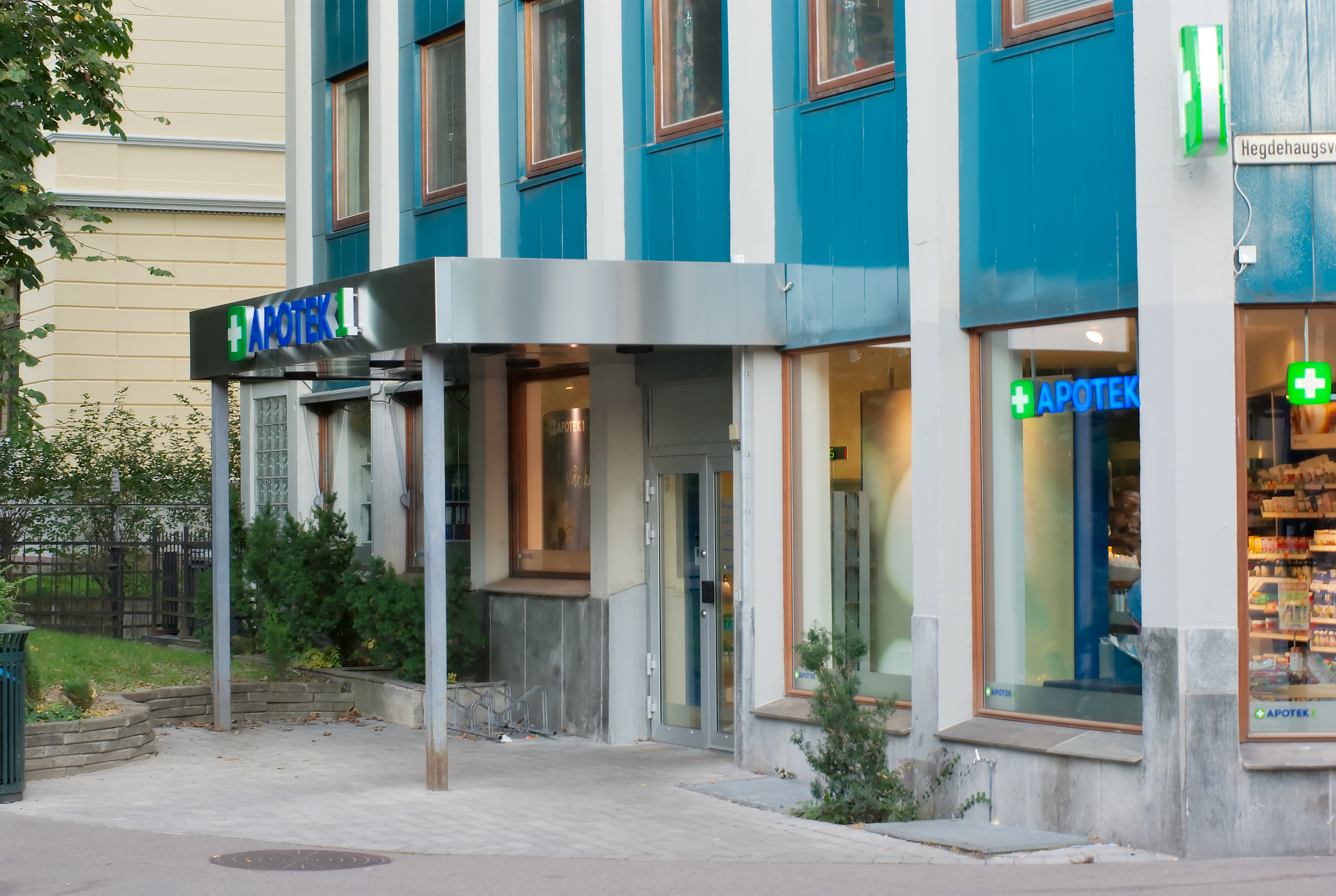
- Apotek 1 pharmacy in Oslo
- Company type: Pharmacy
- Founded: 1999
- Number of locations: 400
- Area served: Norway
- Revenue: NOK 5,592 million (2006)
- Owner: Apokjeden
- Number of employees: 3,500
- Website: www.apotek1.no

Apotek 1 is a pharmacy chain in Norway, owned by Apotek 1 Gruppen AS, with more than 400 locations. The chain was established in 1999, expanded massively since the deregulation in 2001, and now has a 40% market share.
