= Norsk Medisinaldepot =

Norwegian pharmaceutics wholesaler

Norsk Medisinaldepot AS
- Company type: Subsidiary
- Industry: Pharmacies
- Founded: 1957
- Founder: Norwegian Ministry of Health and Care Services
- Headquarters: Oslo, Norway
- Area served: Norway
- Products: Vitusapotek; Ditt Apotek
- Number of employees: 3,000 (2021)
- Parent: Mckesson Corporation
- Subsidiaries: VitusApotek, Ditt Apotek

Norsk Medisinaldepot AS is a pharmaceutics and healthcare products wholesaler in Norway. It also operates the pharmacy chains Vitusapotek and the franchise chain Ditt Apotek. NMD is part of the McKesson Corporation and has approximately 300 pharmacies in Norway. The company is based in Oslo.

== History ==
NMD was created on November 1, 1957, as a government agency that functioned as pharmaceutical wholesaler throughout Norway. It took over this responsibility from five private companies. In 1992 the company bought Apotekernes Fællesindkjøp, previously owned by the pharmacies and that had imported and wholesaled medical equipment. In 1995 two competitors entered the market: Apokjeden (owned by Tamro) and Alliance Boots. Two years later the Storting decided to privatize NMD, and sold 17% to Netherlands-based Apothekers Coöperatie, and the state ownership was transferred from the Norwegian Ministry of Health and Care Services to the Norwegian Ministry of Trade and Industry. Also, the medical equipment subsidiary was sold to the Dutch company. In 1999 2% of the company was sold to 223 pharmacies throughout the country.

On March 1, 2001, the new Pharmacy Act was established, allowing free establishment of pharmacies in Norway. At the same time the state decided to not have any ownership in NMD, and sold its part, along with the rest of the owners, to Celesio. After the deregulation of market almost all pharmacies have been bought by the three wholesaler groups, and NMD created two subsidiaries, NMD Grossisthandel for wholesale and Vitusapotek to operate the pharmacies. In 2007 these were both merged with the mother company.
