= Health trust =

Type of health enterprise in Norway

A health trust or HF (Norwegian: helseforetak) is a health enterprise owned by one of the four regional health authorities in Norway, with responsibility for performing a geographic and/or specialist activities of operations on behalf of the regional health authority. There are 43 HFs in Norway, each led by a board of directors appointed by the authority. Most HFs are responsible for one or more hospitals, though some are solely responsible for pharmacies. The trusts are regulated by the Health Trust Act of 15 June 2001.

== Pharmaceutical trusts ==
The four Regional Health Authorities each own a pharmaceutical trust, organized as a health trust, that manages hospital pharmacies. But some hospitals instead use commercial pharmacies that are part of the chains. All 33 hospital pharmacies belong to the Ditt Apotek chain, on franchise from Norsk Medisinaldepot. Total revenue in 2006 was NOK 3.5 billion.

- Southern and Eastern Norway Pharmaceutical Trust: 19 outlets
- Western Norway Pharmaceutical Trust: 6 outlets
- Central Norway Pharmaceutical Trust: 4 outlets
- Northern Norway Pharmaceutical Trust: 4 outlets
