= History of Braathens SAFE (1946–1993) =

History of Braathens SAFE from founding to 1993

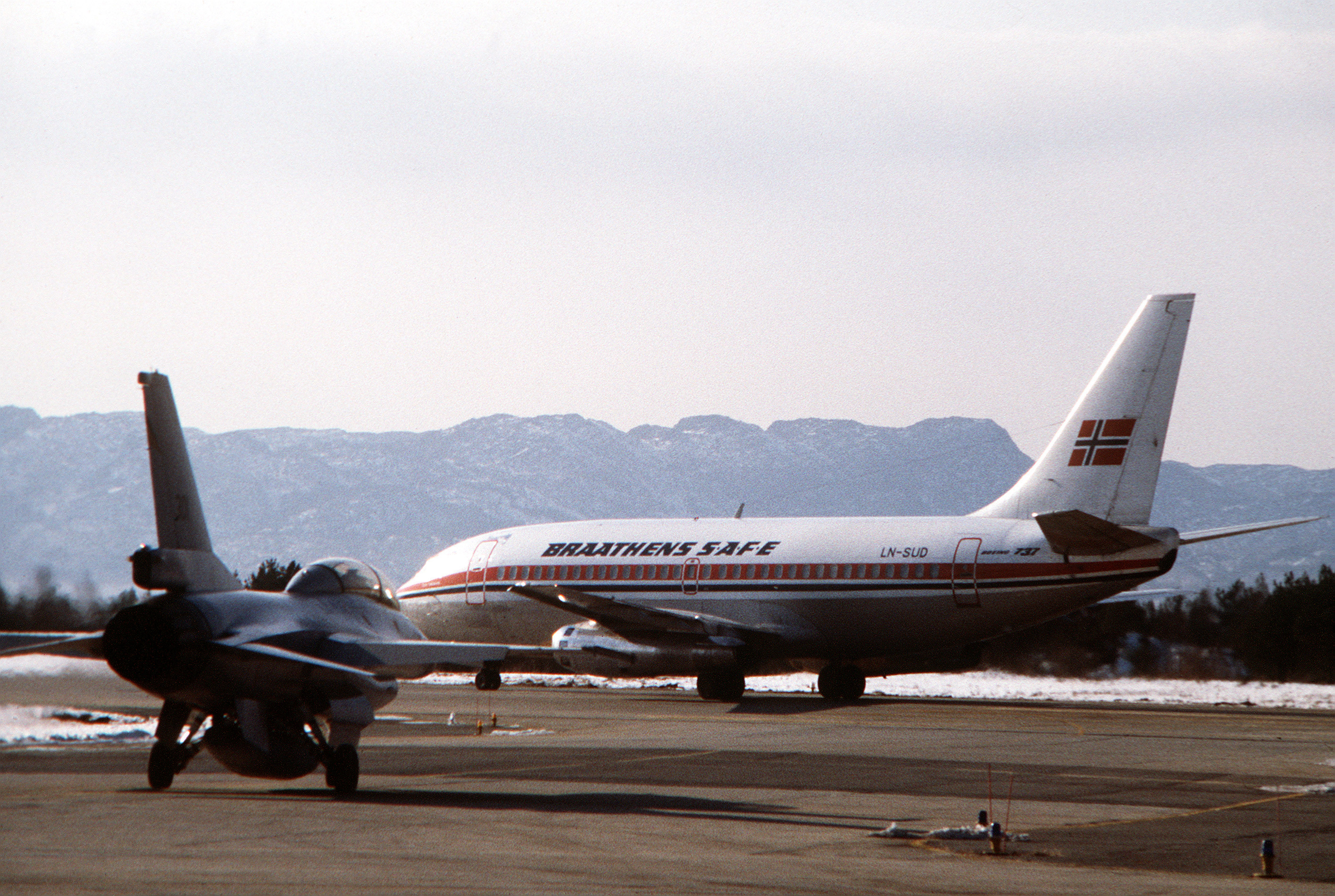
Braathens SAFE Boeing 737-200 at Bergen Airport, Flesland in 1981

Braathens South American & Far East Airtransport A/S or Braathens SAFE was founded by ship-owner Ludvig G. Braathen in 1946. It started as a charter airline based at Oslo Airport, Fornebu in Norway, flying to destinations in the Far East and in South America. At first the airline used Douglas DC-4s, and later also Douglas DC-3s. In 1948, the airline moved to Oslo Airport, Fornebu and started regular scheduled flights to the Far East. In 1952, the airline started cooperation with the Icelandic airline Loftleidir, where until 1960 the two airlines in cooperation flew flights to Reykjavík. Domestic services started in 1951, using de Havilland Herons on a route from Oslo to Stavanger via Tønsberg. Braathens SAFE also established at Stavanger Airport, Sola. A second route was started two years later to Trondheim. The Heron routes also stopped in Farsund, Kristiansand, Notodden to Stavanger and Hamar, Røros to Trondheim.

In 1958, Braathens SAFE started flying to Ålesund and at the same time started flights along the West Coast. In 1959, Fokker F-27s were taken into use, and with the Herons taken out of service, Hamar, Farsund and Tønsberg were terminated. During 1960, the airline flew a single season to Sandefjord and Aalborg. The company also entered the domestic and international charter market during the 1960s, an industry where the airline would eventually grow to become a large Norwegian and Swedish contestant. Services to Bodø and Tromsø started in 1967, although only from Western Norway. Braathens' main domestic competitor was Scandinavian Airlines System (SAS), which operated all the primary domestic routes Braathens SAFE did not, in addition to the international routes. Braathens took Boeing 737-200s and Fokker F-28s into use in 1969; Kristiansund was first served in 1970 and Molde in 1972. From 1984, the airline also operated two Boeing 767s, although they were retired along with the F-28s were in 1986. Services to Longyearbyen started in 1987. From 1987, Braathens SAFE was allowed to make international scheduled flights on certain routes. In 1989, it opened a route to Billund, in 1991 to Malmö, Newcastle and London, and in 1993 to Murmansk. From 1989 to 1994, the airline replaced its fleet with Boeing 737-400 and -500s. From 1989 to 1994, Braathens Helikopter operated services on contract with oil companies to their oil platforms in the North Sea.

== Far East ==
Braathens South American & Far East Airtransport A/S was founded on 26 March 1946 by Ludvig G. Braathen through his shipping company Braathens Rederi. Share capital was 4 million kr, plus loans from the shipping company. Braathens had made good money during World War II with the participation in the Norwegian Shipping and Trade Mission, and received permission to use US$1 million to purchase aircraft. The idea to start an airline had occurred to Braathen in 1936, when the ship Brajara had engine trouble while en route to Japan. The Japanese shipyards could not guarantee that they could repair the ship, and at first it was considered whether the ship should be towed to Europe for repairs. The solution chosen was instead to have the necessary piece made in Amsterdam and flown by KLM. Braathen wanted to have an airline that would be able to fly crew and supplies to his and other ships throughout the world—primarily in the Far East.

Braathen traveled to the United States, where he bought several used Douglas C-54 (DC-4) aircraft from the United States Air Force. These were rebuilt by Texas Maintenance Company (Temco) in Fort Worth, Texas, giving them a capacity of 44 passengers, or 22 passengers and 4 tonnes (3.9 long tons; 4.4 short tons) of cargo. Twenty pilots were recruited and sent to Fort Worth for certification. The first plane, LN-HAV Norse Explorer, landed at Oslo Airport, Gardermoen on 26 December 1946. The next planes were LN-HAT Norse Skyfarer on 11 February 1947 and LN-NAU Norse Trader on 13 March.

The first route ran from Oslo to Cairo via Copenhagen and Paris on 30 January 1947. Afterwards, the company was chartered for several trips from Paris and Marseille, France, to Lydda, Palestine, and Tunis, Tunisia. From Lydda, the aircraft were used to evacuate French and British personnel prior to the creation of Israel. The company's route to Hong Kong was the longest air route in the world. At the time, the only scheduled service to the Far East was operated by British Overseas Airways Corporation using Sandringham flying boats. This route took a fortnight, while KLM had a land-plane route from Amsterdam to Batavia (Djarkarta). The first Braathens SAFE flight was made on 24 February from Oslo, landing at Amsterdam, Marseille, Cairo, Basra, Karachi, Calcutta and Bangkok before Hong Kong, where Norske Skyfarer landed on 8 March. Total flight time was 46 hours. Along the route, Braathens SAFE established contracts with agents, or stationed their own employees.

The regular services could be done with a round trip time of nine to ten days, including overnighting in Cairo, Karachi and Bangkok, and with technical revision of the plane in Hong Kong. At first there were semiweekly services, but by the end of 1947, these had increased to weekly. In June, Braathens SAFE bought a Douglas DC-3, LN-PAS Norse Carrier, and in August another DC-4, LN-PAW Norse Commander, both from KLM. In 1947, Braathens SAFE flew twenty-five trips to Hong Kong, five to New York and one to Johannesburg, South Africa, making a profit of NOK 750,000. The following year, Braathens SAFE started the first trial flights to South America. The first flight was made on 23 August from Stavanger via Reykjavík, Gander and Bermuda to Caracas, where the plane landed on 26 August. In October, the airline flew to Panama, but neither route gave sufficient contracts to commence regular services. In 1948, the airline made fifty trips to Hong Kong, eight to Johannesburg, two to the United States, three to Venezuela and two to Panama.

== Concession ==
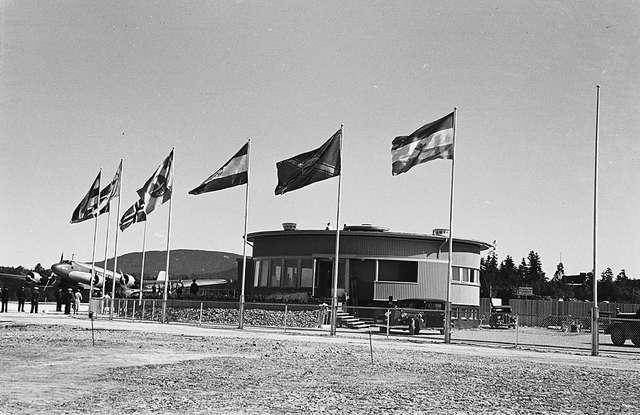
From 1948, Oslo Airport, Fornebu was Braathens SAFE's main base

During World War II, the civil aviation planning was conducted by the Aviation Council. In 1945, they started a limited number of flights that were operated by the Royal Norwegian Air Force. On 2 July 1946, the Norwegian Ministry of Transport and Communications, several large shipping companies and other private investors reestablished Det Norske Luftfartselskap (DNL), with the state owning 20% and the shipping companies 49%. This airline was granted a 20-year monopoly on domestic and international flights. According to the concession, only routes that DNL were not willing to fly themselves, could be granted to other airlines.

By 1948, Braathens SAFE's routes were so regular that several countries stated that a bilateral agreement would have to be negotiated for them to continue. However, the concession that had been granted to DNL did not allow Braathens to fly any scheduled flights. Braathens SAFE applied for fifteen-year concession on 5 February 1948; Minister of Transport Nils Langhelle from the Labor Party knew that he would be violating DNL's concession by granting Braathens SAFE a concession, but at the same time he was worried that Braathens SAFE could easily flag out to another country, from which DNL would receive no protection. The exception in DNL's concession could not be used, since DNL declared that they, through the Scandinavian cooperation Scandinavian Airlines System (SAS), were planning to start a route to the far east. The Directorate for Civil Aviation stated that it was unlikely that DNL/SAS would start such a route within a few years, and recommended Langhelle that Braathens SAFE be granted the route. Concession was granted by the Norwegian Parliament on 3 February 1949, with a duration of five years. The airline had to follow the route Oslo or Stavanger – Amsterdam – Geneva – Rome – Cairo – Basra – Karachi – Bombay – Calcutta – Bangkok – Hong Kong. The concession was made conditional that Braathens SAFE built a technical base at Stavanger Airport, Sola.

The Hong Kong-route was officially opened on 5 August 1949. Braathens SAFE had then moved its operative base from Gardermoen to Oslo Airport, Fornebu. The company stationed technical employees in Rome, Karachi, Bangkok and Hong Kong, as well as having an agreement with KLM. The planes would stop each night and crew and passengers would stay at a hotel. Cabin crew had no training, and learned the job as they worked. Chicken was the most common lunch meal, and the cabin crew had to purchase this fresh each day, usually observing the slaughter to ensure its freshness. In 1949, sixty-seven flights were made to Hong Kong, as well as two to Tokyo, to Venezuela and one to Johannesburg.

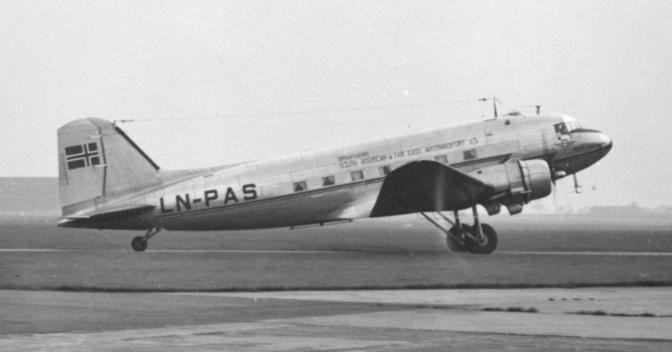
Braathens Douglas DC-3 in 1952 wearing the airline's full name

In 1950, it became increasingly clear that the SAS-cooperation was weak, and that either a full merger or a discontinuation of the cooperation would be necessary. Braathen suggested to the government that DNL, Fred. Olsen Airtransport and Braathens SAFE should merge to create a new domestic airline, but this proposal was rejected by both DNL and Fred. Olsen. In 1949, the Swedish branch of SAS, Aerotransport (ABA), and the Danish branch, Det Danske Luftfartselskab (DDL) started a joint route to the Far East. For a merger to be completed, Danish and Swedish authorities required that SAS be granted all international routes from Norway, meaning that Braathens SAFE would lose its concession from 1 March 1954. The SAS merger was completed on 8 August 1951.

Braathens SAFE applied for a concession on a route from Norway to New York on 27 March 1950. This would allow the airline to connect the route to the Hong Kong-flights, giving one continual service. The proposal would involve the purchase of Douglas DC-6B or Lockheed L-1049 Super Constellation aircraft. The proposal was rejected by the government on 19 April. The following year, Braathens SAFE applied to extend the route to Tokyo, but this was also rejected by the government. In 1951, the company applied to purchase two Super Constellations to replace two sold DC-4s, which was granted, and on 14 January 1953 for an extension of the concession for another ten years. On 13 November 1953, the government rejected the concession application, stating that Norway was bound to grant the concession to SAS on the basis of the merger agreement.

=== Icelandic cooperation ===
In 1952, the Icelandic airline Loftleidir was granted the concession to fly from Keflavík Airport outside Reykjavík to New York and Chicago in the United States, and to Oslo, Copenhagen and London. The company established a hub at Keflavík. Braathens SAFE and Loftleidir made an agreement where Braathens SAFE would lease personnel and mechanical services to Loftleidir, and the two would split profits from the joint venture evenly. This allowed the two airlines to have a continual route between Hong Kong and New York as long as Braathens SAFE's concession lasted. In 1954, another DC-4, LN-HHK, was bought. This aircraft was sold to Loftleidir the following year. In 1956, another DC-4, LN-SUP, was bought, and used for charter and by Loftleidir. In 1959 and 1960, Loftleidir received two new Douglas DC-6B aircraft, with a five-year mechanical agreement with Braathens SAFE. In 1960, the two companies agreed to terminate the cooperation from 1 January 1961.

== Domestic with Herons ==
From 1950, Braathens SAFE started flying charter services to Europe with Douglas DC-6, mainly to Copenhagen and Paris. DNL protested because Braathens SAFE was charging too low ticket prices, while DDL protested against the flights to Copenhagen. In September 1951, Braathens SAFE offered Danish authorities to fly all domestic routes without subsidies, but this was rejected because such a permit could only be issued to Danish airlines. After World War II, only Fornebu, Stavanger Airport, Sola and Kristiansand Airport, Kjevik were in use as land airport. A plan for construction was passed by parliament in 1952, that based the financing of airports as joint civilian and military airports, with funding from NATO.

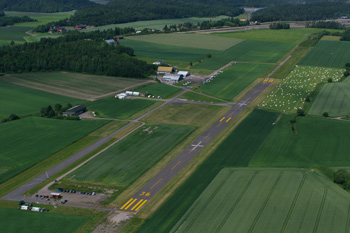
Tønsberg Airport, Jarlsberg was served from 1955 to 1958

In 1951, Braathens SAFE applied for concession for a route from Oslo to Bodø via Trondheim without subsidies. They also stated that they were willing to fly all domestic routes without subsidies, granted that they were awarded all routes. This was based on the acquisition of de Havilland Heron aircraft, which could use shorter runways and has a capacity of 15 people. SAS was granted the concession to Bodø and Trondheim, but the Ministry of Transport issued a concession to Braathens SAFE on the route from Oslo via Tønsberg Airport, Jarlsberg to Stavanger. The plane started in Stavanger in the morning, and operated the opposite direction of SAS' route from Oslo to Stavanger, which continued onwards to London. The first flight was made on 3 May 1952, with the Heron LN-PSG Per. From 7 to 14 May, the plane went on a tour of the country, visiting several airports. Regular services started on 18 August and a one-way ticket cost NOK 95.

On 30 January 1953, Braathens SAFE applied to start a route from Oslo to Trondheim Airport, Lade. A trial permit was granted, and the first flight was made on 18 August. Because Lade had a grass runway, Trondheim Airport, Værnes was used during bad weather. SAS flew a morning flight from Oslo, while Braathens flew the morning route from Trondheim. In 1953, Braathens SAFE stated that to keep their 210 employees and fleet of one DC-4, one DC-3 and two Herons, they would have to receive future domestic services, to compensate for more than 90% of their revenue disappearing with the loss of the Far East route. In 1953, Braathens SAFE applied to fly five routes: Bardufoss – Alta – Kirkenes; Stavanger – Bergen – Trondheim (both with Herons); Tromsø – Alta – Hammerfest; Bodø – Harstad; and Bodø – Harstad – Tromsø (all with de Havilland Canada DHC-3 Otters). The five routes would require NOK 725,000 in annual subsidies. The concessions were granted to DNL, who allowed their partially owned subsidiary Widerøe to fly the sea routes.

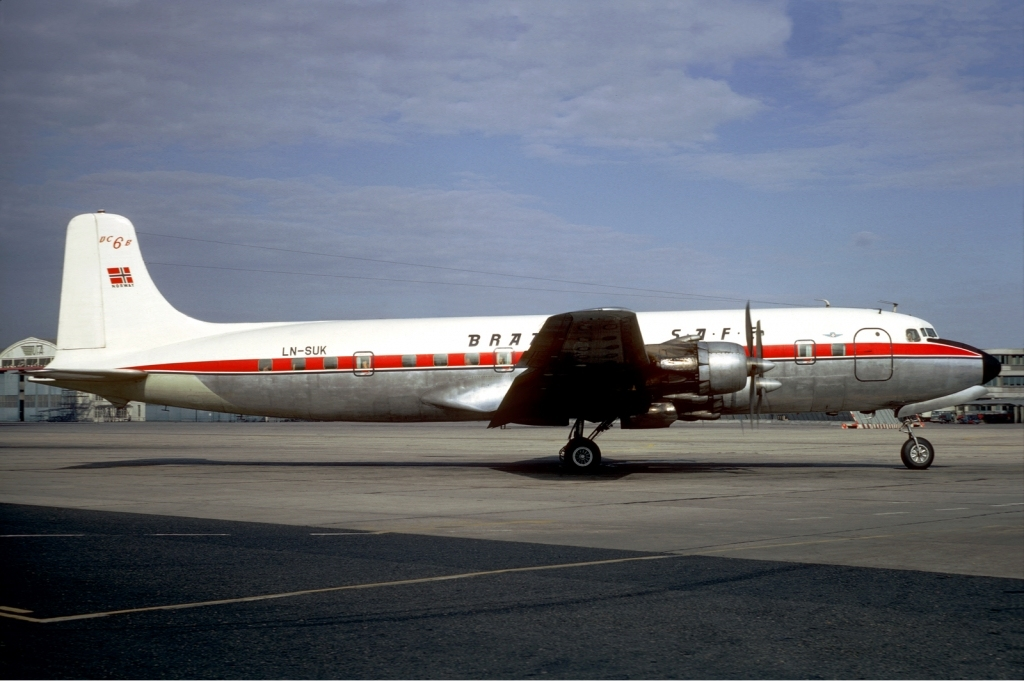
A Braathens SAFE Douglas DC-6B in 1971

Braathens bought six Herons, in addition to one that was leased during 1954. They had been given the common Norwegian names Per, Ola, Pål and Lars. Because of replacements, the airline never operated more than four at a time. In June 1955, Braathens SAFE started landing some of the Oslo–Stavanger planes at Kristiansand Airport, Kjevik and Farsund Airport, Lista. The route, nicknamed the "Milk Route", operated Stavanger – Farsund – Kristiansand – Tønsberg – Oslo in the morning, with a return in the evening. The same year, SAS and Braathens SAFE started negotiating splitting up the domestic routes. Nils Langhelle, then regional director in SAS, suggested creating a merged subsidiary that could fly all domestic routes. On 16 May 1956, Braathens SAFE started landing at Hamar Airport, Stafsberg on the Oslo–Trondheim route, and at Notodden Airport, Tuven on the Oslo–Stavanger route. Both airports had 1,000 metres (3,300 ft) runways that could only be served by small aircraft such as the Heron. From 1959, services to both airports were terminated. Røros Airport was opened on 19 July 1957, and Braathens SAFE landed some of the Oslo–Trondheim services there. After 1958, services were terminated, but after the runway was extended from 1,360 to 1,600 metres (4,460 to 5,250 ft), it was taken into use again in 1963.

The route Stavanger–Bergen–Trondheim was awarded to Vestlandske Luftfartsselskap in 1956, but this company filed for bankruptcy the following year. Ålesund Airport, Vigra was scheduled to open in 1958, and both Braathens SAFE and SAS applied for the concession, along with the route along the West Coast. At first the ministry wanted to issue the concession on the route Stavanger – Bergen – Ålesund – Trondheim to Braathens SAFE and the route Ålesund–Oslo to SAS. But after negotiations, Braathens SAFE stated they were willing to fly the coastal route without subsidies if they were granted the Oslo-route, since that would allow them to cross-subsidize; this was granted by the ministry. An agreement was then made between the ministry, SAS and Braathens SAFE, where both airlines would fly the routes Oslo–Trondheim, Oslo–Stavanger, Oslo–Kristiansand and Kristiansand–Stavanger–Bergen; Braathens SAFE had a monopoly on the routes Oslo–Ålesund and Bergen–Ålesund–Trondheim, while SAS was granted a monopoly on the routes Oslo–Bergen and (Oslo)–Trondheim–Bodø–Bardufoss. In 1958, Braathens SAFE had 77,591 passengers.

=== Hummelfjell Accident ===
On 7 November 1956, the Heron LN-SUR Lars crashed at Hummelfjell after the aircraft had experienced icing problems. The Hummelfjell Accident killed the pilot on impact and one passenger soon afterwards, but the remaining ten people on board survived. Among them was the famous television actor Rolf Kirkvaag, who, despite injury, left the plane along with another passenger after a day and walked to find civilization and informed about the location of the impact, resulting in a rescue party reaching the site.

== Friendship ==
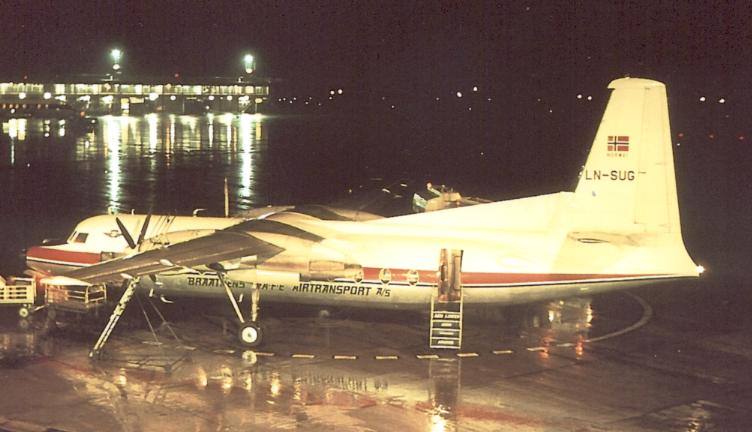
Braathens SAFE Fokker F-27 in August 1964

During the late 1950s, Braathens SAFE started looking for a replacement for the aging DC-3s and Herons. An order was placed with Fokker for the delivery of their new Fokker F-27 Friendship, a two-engine turboprop with cabin pressurization. Braathens SAFE was the second airline to receive the plane, after Aer Lingus. The first craft, LN-SUN, was delivered in December 1958, with the second, LN-SUO, delivered the following year. They were put into service on the main routes: once daily Oslo–Trondheim, once daily Oslo–Ålesund, twice daily Oslo–Stavanger, including one stopping at Kristiansand, and one trip daily Bergen–Ålesund–Trondheim. The delivery of the Friendships made the Herons unnecessary, and these were sold. The two DC-3s were kept as a reserve, and were used for the first part of the summer schedules because of late delivery of LN-SUO. They were also used for charter. The airports at Hamar, Farsund and Tønsberg had too short runways for the Friendship, and these destinations were terminated.

The first flight to the winter-only airport at Longyearbyen on Svalbard was made on 2 April 1959, when Store Norske Spitsbergen Kulkompani chartered a DC-4 from Bardufoss Airport. Store Norske cleared a 1,800 by 40 metres (5,910 by 130 ft) runway on snow for the aircraft. More flights were chartered during the 1960s, and Longyearbyen became a regular charter destination for Braathens SAFE.

From 3 June to 30 September 1960, Braathens SAFE was granted concession on the route from Oslo via Sandefjord Airport, Torp to Aalborg Airport in Denmark. This became possible because SAS had abandoned the route the previous year. It was flown with a DC-3, giving an 80% load factor. On 22 July, the Braathens SAFE applied for a three-year concession, but this was rejected because SAS stated that they would restart the route. In 1961, SAS started the route Stavanger–Kristiansand–Ålborg, and in 1963 on the route Oslo–Kristiansand–Ålborg. The concession allowed SAS to also take passengers on the domestic legs, giving Braathens SAFE competition on the routes to Kristiansand.

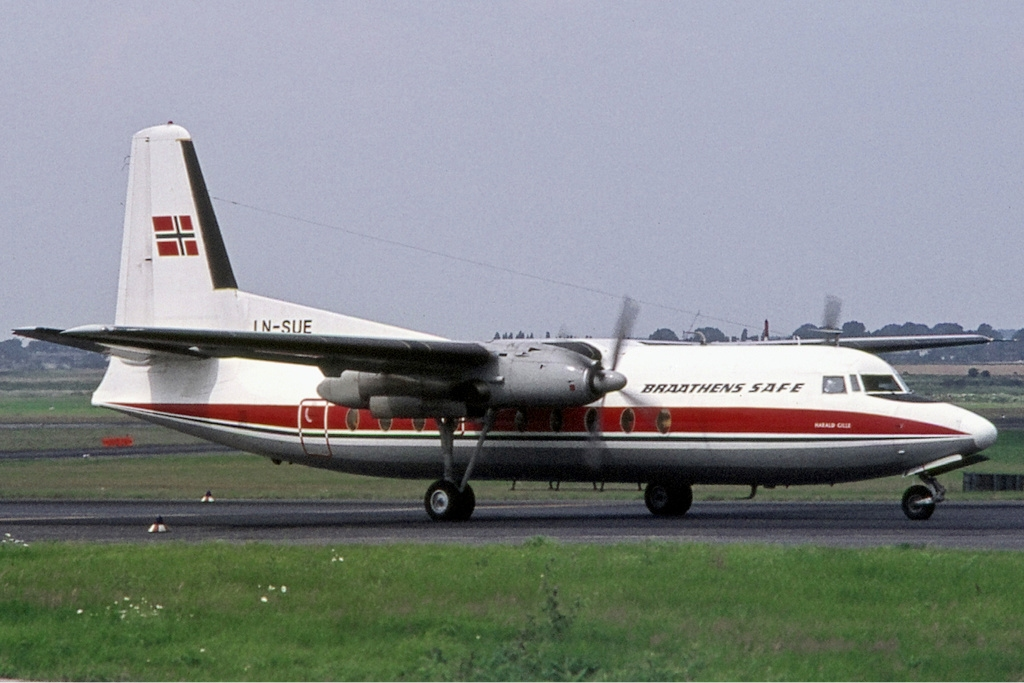
Fokker F-27 in 1974

Passengers traveling from Western to Northern Norway had to transfer from Braathens SAFE to SAS in Trondheim. Both airlines saw this as a strategic opportunity to get routes in each other's territories. On 31 August 1960, Braathens SAFE applied for an extension of its Bergen–Ålesund–Trondheim route onwards to Bodø Airport and Bardufoss Airport. The two airports had been served by SAS from Oslo via Trondheim. SAS presented estimates that between 2.5 and 6.1 passengers transferred at Trondheim each day. Braathens SAFE later proposed that they could fly directly from Bergen and Ålesund to Bodø and Bardufoss, but Braathens SAFE's application was rejected by the ministry. All concessions ended on 31 March 1961, and the ministry extended them all one year. Three new airports, Alta Airport, Lakselv Airport, Banak and Kirkenes Airport, Høybuktmoen, were about to open and the ministry wanted to award new concessions that included these airports. Braathens SAFE applied to operate to all the airports in Northern Norway, but the contract was awarded to SAS. The latter also applied to operate a route from Northern Norway via Trondheim, Ålesund and Bergen to Stavanger, while Braathens SAFE in 1964 again applied for an extension of the West Coast route to Northern Norway. This was moderated to a direct route from Tromsø Airport to Bergen, which SAS received permission for on 4 March 1965.

An additional F-27s was delivered in 1961, and two more in 1962. By then, the Oslo–Stavanger route was expanded to four daily round trips, of which two went via Kristiansand. Ålesund had two round trips, while Trondheim had one. The coastal route had two services, and was branded as the "Airbus". In all, 175,202 passengers were transported, up 40% since the previous year. By 1965, the Trondheim, Ålesund and coast routes had three round trips, while there were four to Kristiansand and five to Stavanger. That year, the right-winged Borten's Cabinet was appointed; Braathens SAFE therefore again applied for an extension of the West Coast route to Tromsø and Bodø. When the government signaled that it would support the application, it caused a major debate, particularly in Denmark and Sweden, and the Danish and Swedish governments threatened to terminate the SAS agreement. On 25 November 1966, with 82 against 62 votes, the Norwegian Parliament voted to allow Braathens SAFE to fly to Bodø and Tromsø as an extension of the West Coast route from 1 April 1967.

On 3 March 1967, parliament decided to build four short take-off and landing airports along the Helgeland coast between Trondheim and Bodø. Braathens placed an order for a de Havilland Canada DHC-6 Twin Otter and planned to start the company Braathens STOL. It applied to operate the route without subsidies, but the concession was rejected and granted with subsidies to Widerøe, which had been operating the routes using seaplanes.

== Charter ==
During the 1950s, the main customers for charter flights had been Norwegian shipping companies, who flew their crew home from ports in Central Europe. In 1959, Saga Tours was created as the first travel agency for Mediterranean charter trips, and the company started a cooperation with Braathens SAFE. The first DC-4 flew to Mallorca that year. In 1961, the company's first Douglas DC-6B was bought. It had a capacity of 96 passengers, and cooperation was also started with Metro and Paddan in Gothenburg. Other charter destinations were London, Alicante and Málaga, both in Spain. That year, Braathens SAFE bought 50% of Saga Tours in a private placement. Braathens SAFE established an office in Gothenburg in 1965. After Vingresor had been bought by SAS and moved to Stockholm three years later, three employees started Atlas Resor in Gothenburg, and started using Braathens SAFE as their airline. By 1966, Braathens SAFE was operating seven DC-6s.

The agreements with Spanish authorities allowed only airlines from the country of origin or from Spain to fly charter flights. But because of the SAS-cooperation, an agreement was made where any Scandinavian airline could fly to Spain from any of the three Scandinavian countries. Domestically, Braathens SAFE received strong competition from Sterling Airways, but on the other hand this allowed Braathens SAFE to fly charter flights from Sweden. In 1968, the large Swedish–Danish charter airline Internord went bankrupt, giving Braathens SAFE increased charter traffic. The company also started purchasing a larger share of Altas Resor, until it took over all the whole company in 1978. In Sweden, Braathens SAFE used its partners to sell charter flights to Norway, and then continue their flights using scheduled flights. Braathens SAFE was hindered by the charter regulations from making intercontinental flights, as well as flights between the Scandinavian capitals. The rules also forced business travelers to use scheduled flights.

== Into the Jet Age ==
In 1965, Braathens SAFE placed an order for three Boeing 737-200s, costing a total ofNOK 100 million. They were intended to do the main haul of the charter market. There had been an internal struggle as to whether the company should purchase the Fokker F-28 Fellowship or the Boeing 737-100, a shorter version of the 737-200. Having a single plane type would give a single pool of pilot and mechanic certifications, and would have saved the company NOK millions in costs. Following the decision to purchase the F-28, Bjørn G. Braathen, son of Ludvig G. and later CEO, left the company.

By 1966, Braathens SAFE had sold all its DC-4s, and had purchased eight F-27s. The DC-6s were used exclusively for charter, with all domestic flights being flown with the F-27s. The same year, the booking system was centralized and moved to offices in Oslo. The company established sales offices in Bodø and Tromsø on 1 March 1967. A new cargo department was opened at Oslo Airport on 29 September. Braathens SAFE applied in a joint venture with the Norwegian America Line to start a cargo flight to the United States and the Far East, but this was declined by the ministry. From 1967, also DC-6s were used on domestic routes. In August, it was announced that Braathens SAFE would replace the F-27s with six new Fokker F-28, and that the F-27s would be sold to the manufacturer. Later, the number of orders of 737s was reduced to two, and of F-28s to five. The Fellowships cost NOK 40 million each.

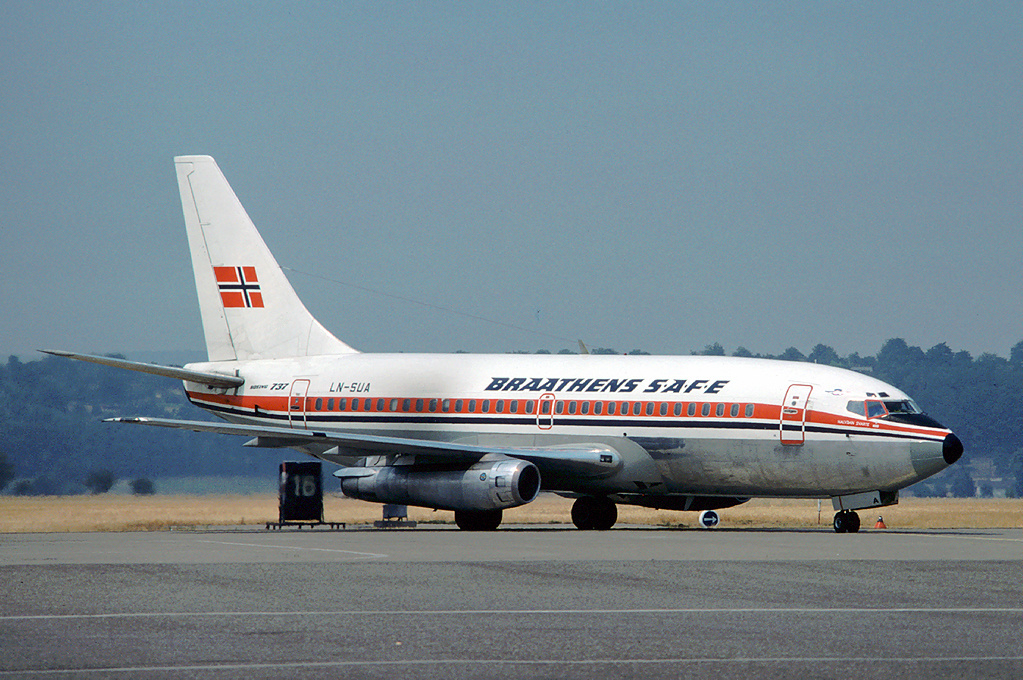
Braathens SAFE Boeing 737-200 in 1976

The first 737, LN-SUS, landed in Oslo on 8 January 1969, followed by LN-SUP on 31 January. Braathens SAFE was the launch customer of the F-28, and the first plane landed in Oslo on 3 March. Five F-28s were delivered in the course of a year, in addition to one aircraft that was leased periodically until 1971. There were several technical problems due to having the earliest models of the F-28, causing some operational difficulties. Two DC-6s were sold, and all but three of the F-27s were sold to Fokker between October 1968 and May 1969. Along with the aircraft came a new simulator, and the simulator division was moved from Sola to Fornebu. On 27 February 1970, the company took into use an IT-system, based at Sola.

With the delivery of the Boeing 737-200s, Braathens SAFE started using these aircraft on the long-haul charter flights. By 1977, there were nine international charter airlines competing with Braathens SAFE: Aviaco, Britannia Airways, Dan-Air, Linjeflyg, Maersk Air, Scanair (owned by SAS), Spantax, Sterling and Transair. In 1976, good exchange rates gave a peak of flights to London, with eleven weekly flights across the North Sea. Braathens SAFE also started flying for Vingresor. In 1976, 44% of the company's revenue was from charter, but by 1979 it had dropped to 36%. During this period, about half of the planes' flying time was related to charter.

== More airports ==
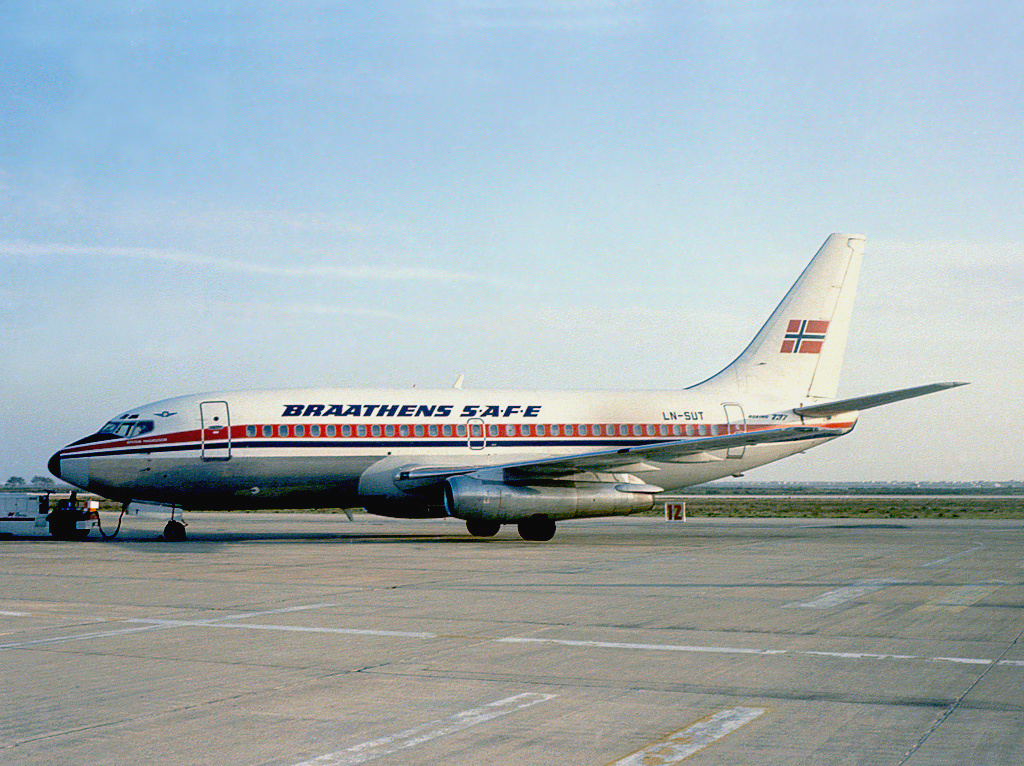
Braathens SAFE Boeing 737-200 at Faro Airport in 1986

Prior to the opening of Kristiansund Airport, Kvernberget, Braathens SAFE applied for a concession to fly to it along the West Coast, as well as the direct route from Oslo. SAS applied to fly the Oslo-service. The ministry wanted Braathens SAFE to fly the route with a concession granted to SAS, but Braathens SAFE rejected this. Instead, they were granted both the routes on temporary basis. The new airport received three daily flights to Oslo, of which two went via Ålesund, and four services on the West Coast route. At the same time, there was a discussion about who was to operate the new STOL-airports on the West Coast. Braathens SAFE stated that they wanted a local airline to do the flying, and chose not to apply. The concession was granted to Widerøe, and Braathens SAFE subsequently bought part of the airline.

On 5 April 1972, Molde Airport, Årø opened. Unlike other primary airports, it had been built and financed by the municipality, and did not become state-owned until 1978. Braathens SAFE started flying both to Oslo and along the West Coast from Molde. The same year, the airline for the first time exceeded one million domestic passengers. It also started with five weekly cargo flights with flowers from Genova, Italy. The following year, the last DC-6 was sold, after the type had been phased out since 1969.

The same year, the government appointed a commission, led by Bue Fjermeros, to look into the organization of the domestic air routes. Since the last compromise in splitting routes, the traffic had increased more in Braathens SAFE's domain that SAS'. The commission also looked a to whom the two next airports that would be opened, Haugesund Airport, Karmøy and Harstad/Narvik Airport, Evenes, would be given. Neither company wanted to cooperate beyond the existing arrangement of coordinating their routes time-wise, along with those of Widerøe. In addition, Braathens SAFE bought handling services from SAS at Gardermoen, Bergen, Bodø and Tromsø, while SAS bought handling services from Braathens SAFE at Stavanger. The commission granted SAS the rights to fly from Oslo to Haugesund, Harstad/Narvik and the new airport Svalbard Airport, Longyear. Braathens SAFE was allowed to fly from Bergen to Northern Norway via Ålesund, Molde and Kristiansund. SAS lost the right to fly directly from Bergen to Northern Norway. When the matter was passed by parliament, they also granted SAS the right to fly from Oslo to Stavanger, even if their planes did not continue abroad.

=== Flight 239 ===
On 23 December 1972 at 16:30, the company's most fatal accident occurred. F-28 LN-SUY Sverre Sigurdson on Flight 239 from Ålesund to Oslo crashed at Asker, killing 40 of the 45 people on board, including the crew of three. The cause of the accident was never discovered, although a possibility could have been faults with the instrument landing system.

== Times of change ==
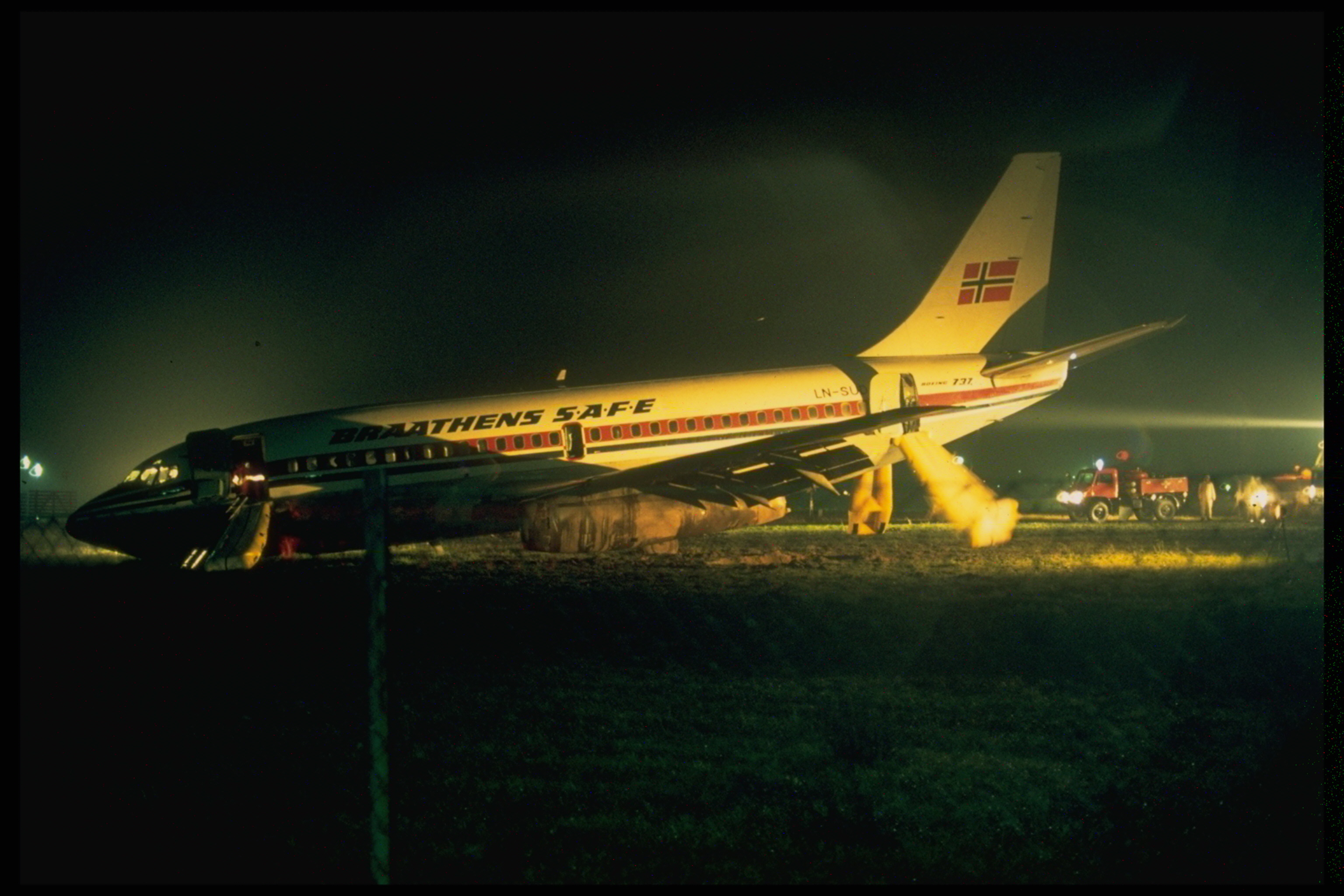
An accident with Boeing 737-200 LN-SUD on 31 October 1977 at Kristiansand Airport, Kjevik

Following the steep increase of oil prices in 1973, Braathens SAFE increased the ticket prices with about 30%, giving for the first year a reduction in the number of travelers. The IT-system Bracar was introduced on 4 February 1974, connecting all locations with 53 terminals, rationalizing 20 man-years. In 1974, Annæus Schjødt jr. became chair, and the following year, the employees were represented with two board members. The remaining three F-27s were sold to the Braathens Rederi-owned Busy Bee between 1975 and 1977. From 1 January 1976, Braathens SAFE introduced "Green Routes", where passengers were granted 35% discount if they traveled on Saturdays or Sunday morning, booked a round trip and were away for at least a full week or over a weekend. From 1972 to 1976, the company's revenue doubled, to NOK 500 million, while production increased 18%. The main contributing factor was the increase of labor costs, that had almost doubled in the four years, although also higher fuel prices and taxes contributed. In 1976, the airline transported 1,154,000 scheduled and 485,000 chartered passengers. Braathens SAFE had a 37% scheduled market share and 31% share of the charter flights. The largest traffic increases were in Stavanger, Bergen and Trondheim. During the late 1970s, Braathens SAFE increased the number of direct flights between these cities, without increasing the number of landings in Ålesund and Kristiansand. From 1 April 1977, the airline lost its dispensation to operate with reduced cabin crew, and was forced to increase the number on the F-28 from one to two, and on the 737 from two to three. At the same time, the airline introduced in-flight meals.

Ludvig G. Braathen died on 27 December 1976 while he was still CEO. He was succeeded by his son Bjørn G. Braathen, who had returned to the company a few years earlier. In 1977, Braathens SAFE made NOK 10 million in profit on the Trondheim route and NOK 4 million on the routes from Oslo to Kristiansand and Stavanger. At the same time, the airline lost NOK 6 million on the routes to from Oslo to Ålesund, Molde and Kristiansund, and NOK 18 million on the coastal routes between Stavanger and Tromsø. From 1 October 1978, the company also introduced 50% youth discount for people under 26 years. From 1 May 1978, there was introduced a NOK 100 tax on international charter flights. The same year, Braathens SAFE bought 15% of Bergenske Dampskibsselskab, that owned 51% of the travel agency Bennett Reisebureau. This was to try to secure influence over the chain, that was also owned 31% by SAS. A new, neutral ticketing system, SMART, was introduced in 1980 for all travel agents in Norway and Sweden. Following this, Braathens SAFE sold its stake in Bergenske with a profit.

Starting with the delivery of the F-28s and 737s, all planes were named after Norwegian kings. The last three F-27s were also given such names. During the 1970s, Braathens SAFE took delivery of eleven 737s, supplementing the four F-28s. The third delivered, LN-SUA, had a cargo door on the side, making it ideal for cargo flights. The three planes delivered in 1979 had extended range tanks making direct flights to the Canary Islands possible. In 1979, the company started looking into possible replacements for their fleet, considering larger aircraft.

The late 1970s and early 1980s was a time of economic problems for airlines worldwide. Passenger numbers stabilized, and Braathens SAFE introduced a 15% discount to purchasers of 100 tickets at one time. The company hit NOK 1 billion in revenue in 1981. Discounted tickets were not sufficient to cover the increasing costs, particularly related to fuel, and the company introduced the internal campaign Bra-82. This involved a more market-oriented management and a focus on service increase, including better regularity and free coffee. During the summer, the reduced demand made the airline introduce discounted "summer tickets" for NOK 280 on any route in Southern Norway. This gave a 75% load factor, the highest for the whole year.

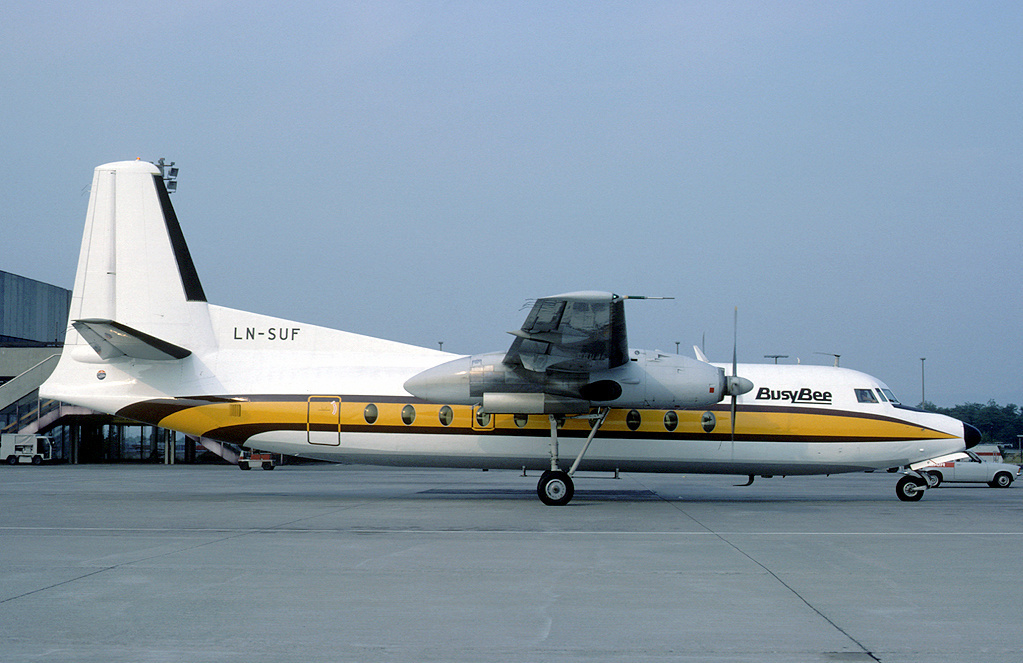
Busy Bee flew Fokker F-27s for Braathens on routes too small for 737s

In 1982, Braathens SAFE bought 15% of DNL. It also applied, though the sister company Braathens Helikopter, for concessions for helicopter services from Stavanger to offshore oil platforms. As a reaction, the incumbent, Helikopter Service, applied for Braathens SAFEs West Coast routes. At this point, SAS bought 15% of Helikopter Service. In 1984, Braathens SAFE introduced services to Farsund Airport, using wet leased F-27s from Busy Bee. The same arrangement was used to connect Haugesund to Bergen and Stavanger. In Haugesund, this was in competition with Norving. Busy Bee-operated planes were also used on routes from Sandefjord in competition with Norsk Flytjeneste. The same year, the cabin crew had a 14-day strike, halting all flights. It was caused by the company paying lower wages than SAS and Busy Bee. In 1985, a new booking system was introduced, that allowed overbooking. This gave increased revenue, but the company had to start compensating rejected passengers with a full refund and a free seat on the next flight. On 16 December 1985, the airline's administration moved into the a new building, the Diamond, located at Fornebu. The frequent flyer program Bracard was launched in September 1985. It was a cooperation with Inter Nor Hotels, and gave special privileges to travelers that made 25 full-price trips per year with Braathens.

== New Boeings ==
In 1980, the management of Braathens SAFE decided that it needed larger aircraft if the company was to stay competitive on charter flights. Larger aircraft could be put into service on the main services from Oslo, Gothenburg and Stockholm, while the 737s could be used to smaller destination and from other cities. On 25 February 1980, the company announced that it had ordered two Boeing 767-200 planes, with an option for two addition craft. The cost of the two firm orders was about NOK 500 million. This would allow the aircraft to be used for both domestic scheduled flights and for charter, and was configured with 242 seats. This was less than charter-only airlines, for instance Britannia had their planes configured with 273 seats. Braathens SAFE's planes were delivered on 23 March and in November 1984. The following year showed increasing charter traffic, although it only made up 25% of the company's revenue. The company had considered the smaller Boeing 757, but did not have sufficient range. Also the Airbus A310 was close to being chosen.

The 767s were launched as "First Business Class" to charter travelers, but the business model was not successful. The new consumer groups entering the market had low willingness to pay, and the demand for premium charter services was low. The company was faced with not being able to charter out the plane because of the low seat numbers, but could not put in the extra seats because of the aircraft also being used on the scheduled market. Using so large aircraft on the short-haul flights in Southern Norway gave little economy-of-scale, and the airline seldom needed the increased capacity. Braathens SAFE also had problems, because from order to delivery, the exchange rates had increased from 5 to 9 NOK per USD, almost doubling the price in NOK. In 1986, the two 767s were sold. Two years later, Altas Resor was sold, and the following year Saga. Braathens SAFE closed its bases in Gothenburg and Stockholm, but remained a charter operator with 737s from Norway.

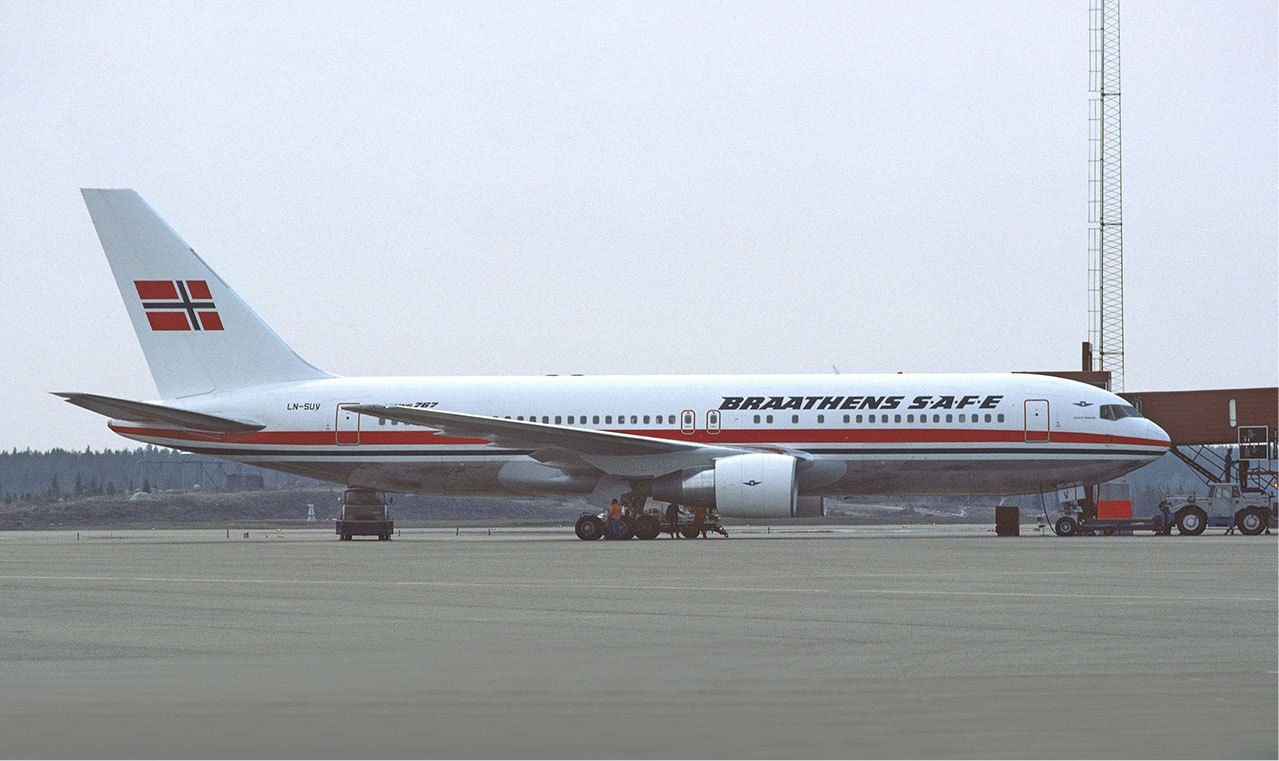
Boeing 767-200 LN-SUV at Stockholm-Arlanda Airport in 1984

Following the decision to sell the two 767s, management also decided to sell the four remaining F-28s. This would allow Braathens to operate a fleet of pure 737-200, giving lower operating costs. One 737 was taken out of service in 1984, and the four F-28s sold in 1986. The same year, seven more 737-200s were delivered, along with two more in 1987 and 1988. By then, Braathens SAFEs entire fleet consisted of nineteen 737-200s. At the same time, Boeing had launched the 737-300, a slightly larger aircraft with new CFM-56 engines. Braathens SAFE considered the new aircraft, but where concerned that it used a traditional mechanical cockpit. The airline also needed larger aircraft for the charter traffic, and smaller aircraft for the domestic routes. The airline also considered the McDonnell Douglas MD-80 and the Airbus A320, but settled on the 737 following the announcement of the stretched 737-400, with 156 seats, and the shortened 737-500, with 124 seats. These had glass cockpits, and Braathens SAFE would be among the first airlines to receive both models. To finance the purchase, the airline sold all but two of the 737-200s and leased them back. For some of the aircraft, they received more money than they had paid.

=== Hijacking ===
On 21 June 1985, the 737-200 LN-SUG Harald Gille, with 121 passengers en route from Trondheim to Oslo, was hijacked by the 24-year-old Stein Arvid Huseby. He had threatened a flight attendant with an air gun. He demanded to talk to Prime Minister Kåre Willoch and Minister of Justice Mona Røkke and a press conference to make a political statement. His demands were not met, and he surrendered while the plane was parked in Oslo. This was the first hijacking in Norway.

== Competition and new planes ==
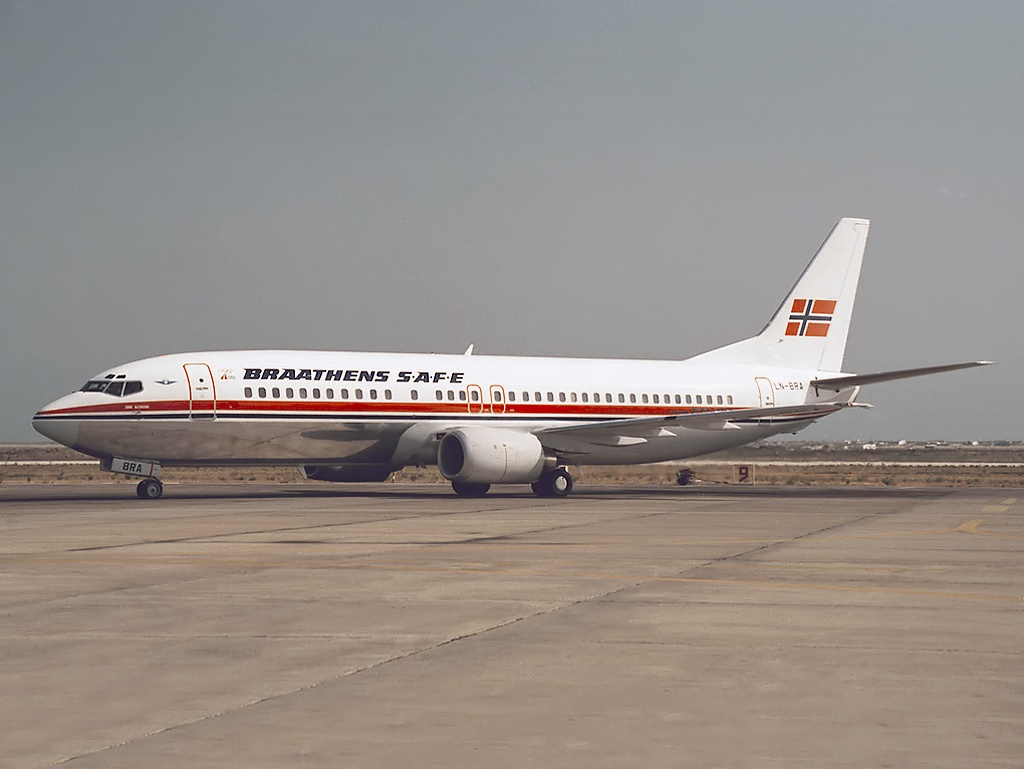
A Braathens SAFE Boeing 737-400 in 1989

The F-28s had the largest regularity problems, mostly due to the number of landings, which could count up to 16 per day. For instance, LN-SUO flew 36,000 hours with 76,000 landings. The last flight was made on 16 December 1986, and the aircraft sold for NOK 45 million each. Although the F-28 was taken out of service, some of the routes on the West Coast needed to be operated with smaller aircraft than the 737. The company made an agreement to wet lease Busy Bee F-27s one some of the routes, while the most trafficked ones would be taken over by 737s.

A 1985 government committee, led by State Secretary Per Arne Watle, recommended that more route be flown by both Braathens SAFE and SAS, and that additional airlines be allowed to start other routes. On 5 September 1985, Braathens SAFE applied for the route Trondheim – Bodø – Harstad/Narvik – Tromsø and Tromsø–Longyearbyen. SAS had stated that it was fine with them if other airlines started flying international routes they did not, and on 17 October Braathens SAFE also applied for the routes Bergen–Stavanger–Paris, Bergen–Stavanger–Manchester, Oslo–Stavanger–Brussels and Trondheim–Bergen–Newcastle. The applications were rejected and it was agreed upon that SAS would retain all rights to fly internationally between Oslo, Bergen, Stavanger, Gothenburg, Stockholm, Copenhagen and Århus.

A new round of concession applications were filed in 1987: Trondheim to Northern Norway, Tromsø–Longyearbyen, Oslo–Billund and Oslo–Alicante. The right-winged Willoch's Second Cabinet decided to use three principles in issuing new concessions: keeping the array of local routes, granting concessions on the terms that the airlines would continue to cross-subsidize routes, and to introduce competition on the largest routes. Braathens SAFE was given permission to fly Oslo–Bergen and Western Norway – Trondheim – Bodø – Tromsø, plus once daily Oslo–Trondheim–Bodø, as well as Tromsø–Longyearbyen. At the same time, SAS was allowed to fly freely on the routes Oslo–Trondheim and Oslo–Stavanger. In 1988, Braathens SAFE introduced automatic check-in machines in Oslo, Stavanger, Bergen, Ålesund and Trondheim.

The routes operated by Norwegian Air Shuttle for Braathens SAFE on the West Coast

The first 737-400, LN-BRA, was delivered to the airline on 9 July 1989. The 19 737-200s were gradually handed to their owners, while seven 737-400s and seventeen 737-500s were delivered until 1994. The investment cost NOK 4.5 billion. By the end of 1993, the company had NOK 3.4 billion in debt. On 1 June 1989, Erik G. Braathen, son of Bjørn G., took over as CEO at the age of 34. In 1992, Busy Bee filed for bankruptcy; the company's fleet of three Fokker 50s were transferred to the newly established Norwegian Air Shuttle, which started wet-leased operations along the West Coast for Braathens SAFE. As demand increased through the 1990s, the fleet was extended to six aircraft.

== International routes ==
Braathens SAFE was also given the right to fly its first international scheduled flights for the first time in several decades. On 19 August 1988, the airline was granted concession to fly to Billund in Denmark. At the same time, Air-X was granted concession to fly the route via Sandefjord and Skien. The route started on 2 May 1989. Previously the rules stated that if SAS flew to a non-Scandinavian destination from any capital, no other Scandinavian airlines could fly to that city. Braathens SAFE lost many contracts in the charter market in 1990, following Scanair's purchase of larger Douglas DC-10 aircraft. On 18 May 1990, Braathens SAFE was awarded the concession a route from Oslo, Bergen and Stavanger to Newcastle, which opened on 3 April 1991. The airline was also awarded the route from Tromsø to Murmansk, Russia, once per week from 28 January 1993.

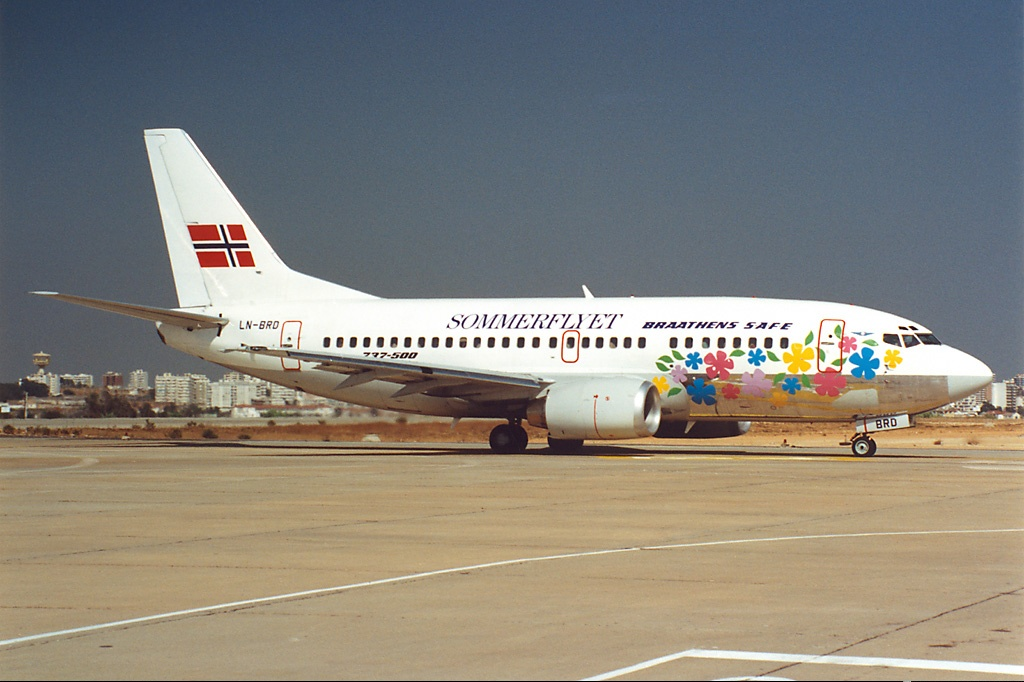
Braathens SAFE Boeing 737-500 in 1990 in a special summer livery

On 19 June 1990, SAS announced that all its services to London Gatwick Airport would be moved to London Heathrow Airport, where most of its services had landed. The same day, the Ministry of Transport announced that any Scandinavian airline could apply for and receive concessions to fly to Gatwick. On 25 June, Braathens SAFE applied to fly to London, but instead wanted to fly to London Stansted Airport, to have better landing slots. The concession was granted on 18 January 1991, but the airline chose to not start the route. The company had been granted a concession to Malmø in Sweden, and the route opened on 2 May 1991 with two daily departures. This was later reduced to one. In October 1992, the two airlines that flew from Oslo to Gatwick, Norway Airlines and Dan-Air, filed for bankruptcy. [--> this information is false: Dan-Air never filed for bankruptcy; they got taken over by British Airways in November 1992!] Braathens SAFE immediately decided to start the route, with a departure at about 10:30 that would allow connections to the rest of the domestic network. Six days later, the first schedules were published in the newspaper, slots and British permission was granted three days after that. Another two days after that, the service started.

At the time, Denmark was a member of the European Union (EU), while Sweden and Norway had applied and were awaiting referendums to determine membership. EU was working to deregulate the airline market from 1995, which could cause problems for the Scandinavian agreements. In preparation for this, Braathens SAFE started negotiations with Linjeflyg of Sweden and Maersk Air of Denmark to create an alliance to compete with SAS. In particular, the three airlines wanted to capture the two million passengers that travelled between the three Scandinavian capitals: Oslo, Copenhagen and Stockholm. Instead, SAS was given permission to purchase Linjeflyg in exchange for the Swedish airline market being deregulated from 1 July 1992. From 23 October 1992, the Norwegian Armed Forces stopped chartering aircraft and started using scheduled flights to fly 240,000 personnel annually. Since most of the transport was between Northern and Southern Norway, this gave reduced revenue for Braathens SAFE.

== Helicopters ==
On 1 September 1989, Ludvig G. Braathens Rederi founded Braathens Helikopter. The shipping company had signed an agreement with the oil companies Norsk Hydro, Phillips Petroleum and Statoil to provide helicopter transport for their crews to their offshore oil installations Ekofisk, Oseberg, Gullfaks, Veslefrikk. This was the first time the incumbent Helikopter Service had received competition on their offshore helicopter services. The initial agreement secured Braathens Helikopter a revenue of NOK 800 million in the course of five years, and gave the company a 20% market share. Four 19-seet Aérospatiale Super Puma helicopters were ordered, each costing NOK 60 million. Total investment costs were NOK 300 million. Two helicopters were stationed at Stavanger Airport, Sola and two at Bergen Airport, Flesland. The initial contract involved flying 10,000 passengers per year.

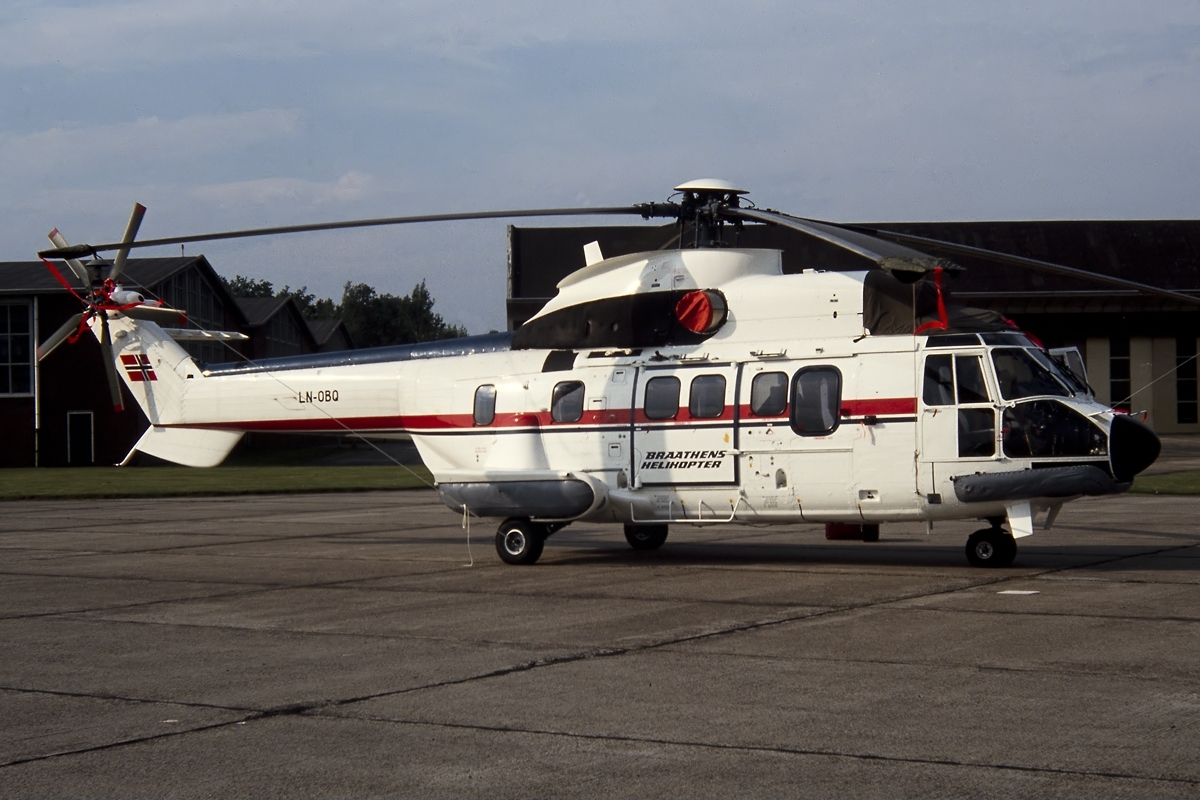
Aerospatiale AS-332 Super Puma at Groningen Airport in 1990

Twenty-two pilots were hired along with a total staff of 70, and services started on 1 September 1990. In June 1991, Braathens Helikopter signed a three-year agreement with Amoco for flights from Stavanger to Valhall. The contract had an option for a two-year extension. The revenue was between NOK 100 and 200 million, depending on the length of the contract and the capacity needed. Operations started in February 1992, and involved the company purchasing another two Super Pumas. On 10 September, Braathens Helikopter was awarded the contract with British Petroleum for flights from Stavanger to Ula and Gyda. The contract gave a revenue of up to NOK 300 million in the course five years. Operations started on 1 November 1992, and involved about 2,000 hours of flying per year. With this contract, Braathens Helikopter had about a 30% market share. Braathens purchased one more Super Puma as a consequence of the contract. After operations started, the company had grown to 120 employees and was the second-largest helicopter operator in the country.

Braathens Helikopter and Helikopter Service announced on 1 October 1993 that the two companies would merge from 1 January 1994. Ludvig G. Braathens Rederi would be paid with NOK 225 million in Helikopter Service shares. The Norwegian Competition Authority stated they would have to look at the merger, since the new company would have an almost-monopoly on offshore flights. However, the ministry stated that the authority could not hinder the merger, because by the time new contracts were awarded in 1995, helicopter operators from foreign countries would also be allowed to bid. The ownership of Braathens Helikopter was transferred to Helikopter Service on 14 December. Ludvig G. Braathens Rederi received 14% of the shares in the merged company. They were immediately sold, giving Ludvig G. Braathens Rederi a NOK 170 million profit on the five-year venture.
