= Blane oil field =

Oil field located in Norway

- Location within North Sea
- Country: Norway; United Kingdom
- Location: North Sea
- Block: N 1/2-1; UK 30/3a
- Offshore/onshore: Offshore
- Coordinates: 56.847683°N 2.498706°E
- Operator: Talisman Energy (UK) Limited
- Partners: Talisman Energy (43.002%); Eni (18.002%); Roc Oil Company (12.501%); MOC Exploration (UK) (13.994%); Dana Petroleum (12.501%)

Field history
- Discovery: 1989
- Start of production: 2007; 19 years ago

Production
- Current production of oil: 10,224 barrels per day (~5.095×10^{5} t/a)
- Recoverable oil: 30.4 million barrels (~4.15×10^{6} t)
- Producing formations: Paleocene sandstones of Forties

Blane (Norwegian: Blanefeltet) is an offshore oil field located in the southern Norwegian and northern British sectors of North Sea. The Blane facilities are located on the British continental shelf and are tied to the Ula oil field which is located 34 km (21 mi) to the northeast via subsea pipeline. The field was discovered in 1989 and produces high quality oil.

== Ownership ==
Talisman Energy is the operator with 25.002% of interest in the project. Other partners include Roc Oil Company (12.501%), MOC Exploration (UK) (13.994%), Eni UK Limited (13.897%), Eni ULX Limited (4.105%), Dana Petroleum (BVUK) Limited (12.501%), Talisman Energy Norge AS (18.000%). Initial investment in the field was £250 million.

== Production ==
Blane is located in approximately 70 metres (230 ft) of water. The main reservoir stands at 3,000 metres (9,800 ft) in the marine Paleocene sandstones of the Forties Formation. Development drilling started on 13 May 2006. The production started on 12 September 2007. Blane field, tied to Ula platform, consists of two horizontal production wells with gas lift and one water injection well. The field produces 10,224 barrels per day (1,625.5 m^{3}/d) and production is expected to reach 17,000 barrels per day (2,700 m^{3}/d). The production involves utilization of pressure support from injection of water produced from Tambar, Blane and Ula fields.

== See also ==
- Oselvar oil field
- Tambar oil field
- Norpipe
- North Sea oil
- Economy of Norway
- Economy of the United Kingdom
