= Braathens Helikopter =

Norwegian helicopter airline

IATA	ICAO	Call sign
—	—	Bee Copter
- Founded: 1 September 1989
- Ceased operations: 31 December 1993
- Operating bases: Stavanger Airport; Bergen Airport
- Parent company: Ludvig G. Braathens Rederi
- Headquarters: Sola, Norway
- Key people: Bjørn G. Braathen (owner); Bjarne Sortland (managing director)

Braathens Helikopter A/S was a Norwegian helicopter airline based at Stavanger Airport and Bergen Airport. It used a fleet of seven Aérospatiale Super Pumas to serve offshore oil platforms in the North Sea. The customers were Amoco, BP, Norsk Hydro, Phillips Petroleum and Statoil, serving their oil fields Ekofisk, Oseberg, Gullfaks, Veslefrikk, Valhall, Ula and Gyda. Braathens Helikopter operated from 1989 to 1993, after which it was sold to and merged with the main competitor, Helikopter Service. Braathens Helikopter was owned by Ludvig G. Braathens Rederi and was a sister company of the airline Braathens SAFE.

== Operations ==
Braathens Helikopter was a pure helicopter airline, with the main base at Stavanger Airport and a secondary base at Bergen Airport. It operated seven Aérospatiale Super Puma helicopters, each with nineteen seats. They were used exclusively on long-term contracts with oil companies to ship crews to their oil platforms in the Norwegian sector of the North Sea. The company employed at the most 120 people, was owned by Ludvig G. Braathens Rederi, and was a sister company of Braathens SAFE. The airline served seven oil fields: Ekofisk, Gullfaks, Gyda, Oseberg, Ula, Valhall, Veslefrikk. These were on contract with Amoco, BP, Norsk Hydro, Phillips Petroleum and Statoil. The company had a 30% market share before it was sold.

== History ==
Ludvig G. Braathens Rederi's first attempt at entering the helicopter market was in 1982, when it applied for a concession from the Norwegian Ministry of Transport and Communications to operate offshore helicopters, which it was awarded in 1983. As a protest, the incumbent Helikopter Service applied for the airline routes that Braathens SAFE operated from Stavanger, but this application was rejected.

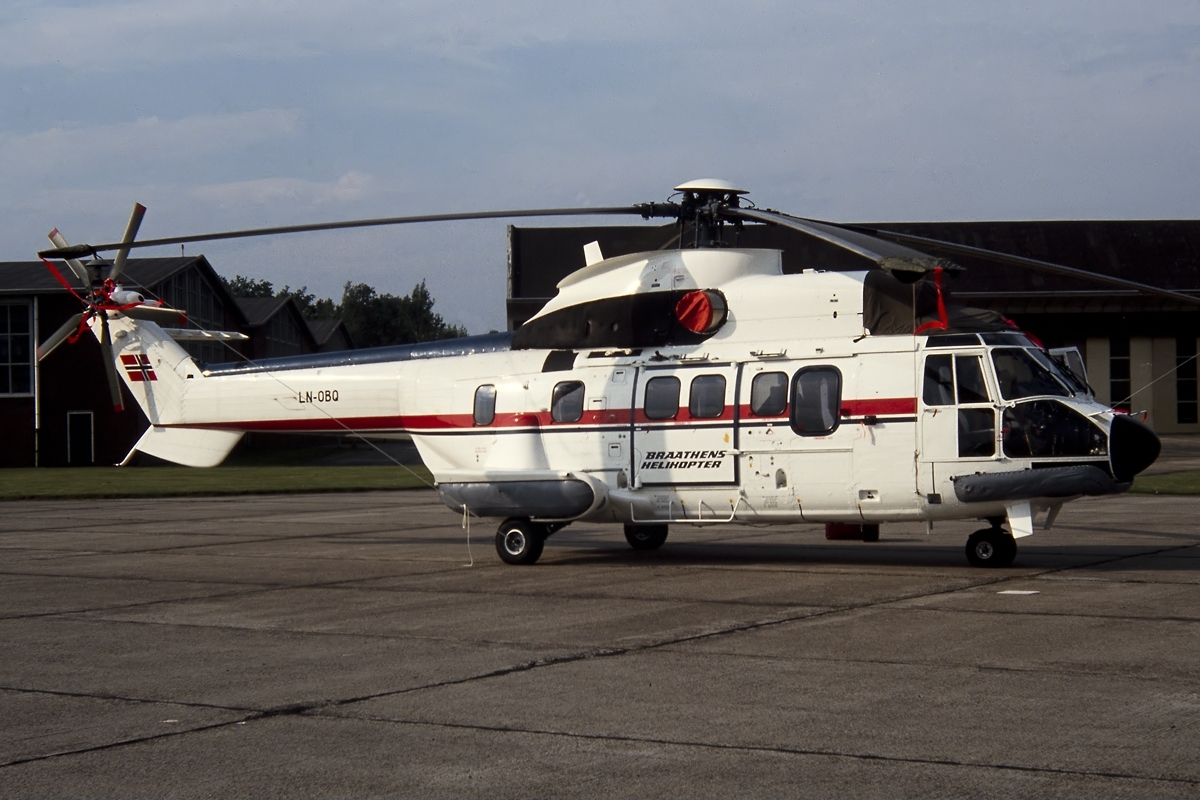
Aerospatiale AS-332 Super Puma at Groningen Airport in 1990

The airline was not founded until 1 September 1989, after Ludvig G. Braathens Rederi, the owner of Braathens SAFE, made an agreement with the oil companies Phillips Petroleum, Norsk Hydro and Statoil. The agreement involved flights to the platforms Ekofisk, Oseberg, Gullfaks og Veslefrikk. Prior to this, Helikopter Service had held a monopoly on flights for the oil companies to their offshore installations. The oil companies wanted to establish a competitor to Helikopter Service to press down prices. The initial agreement gave a revenue of 800 million kr and gave the new company a 20% market share. Four 19-seat Aérospatiale Super Puma helicopters were ordered, each costing NOK 60 million. Total investment costs were NOK 300 million. Two helicopters were stationed at Stavanger Airport, Sola, and two at Bergen Airport, Flesland.

Bjarne Sortland was appointed managing director. The first helicopter was delivered in May, with a new helicopter being delivered each month. They were named Havsulen, Havhesten, Havørn and Havsvale. Owner Bjørn G. Braathen stated that his goal was that the airline would reach a 50% market share. In 1990, another challenger, Mørefly, had also established themselves in the market. For the start of operations, Braathens Helikopter hired 22 pilots, most of them previously working for the Royal Norwegian Air Force. The company had 70 employees in total. Services started on 1 September 1990, where the initial contract involved flying 10,000 passengers per year.

In January 1991, the company placed an order and an option for the Super Puma. In June, Braathens Helikopter signed a three-year agreement, with an option for a two-year extension, with Amoco for flights from Stavanger to Valhall. The revenue was between NOK 100 and 200 million, depending on the length of the contract and the capacity needed. Operations started in February 1992, and involved the company purchasing the Super Puma they had an option for. On 10 September, Braathens Helikopter was awarded the contract with British Petroleum for flights from Stavanger to Ula and Gyda. The contract gave a revenue of up to NOK 300 million in the course five years. Operations started on 1 November 1992, and involved about 2,000 hours of flying per year. With this contract, Braathens Helikopter had about a 30% market share. As a consequence of the contract, Braathens purchased another Super Puma. After operations started, the company had grown to 120 employees and was the second-largest helicopter operator in the country. The company made a profit of NOK 14 million in 1991, NOK 11 million in 1992 and NOK 23 million in the seven first months of 1993.

In 1993, Norway decided to allow any airline from the European Economic Area to operate helicopter services in Norway from 1995. This meant that companies like Bristow Helicopters, KLM and Maersk Air could start operation in Norway. This would be coordinated through common technical rules for helicopters through the Joint Aviation Authorities. Braathens Helikopter and Helikopter Service announced on 1 October 1993 that the two companies would merge from 1 January 1994. Ludvig G. Braathens Rederi would be paid NOK 225 million in Helikopter Service shares. The Norwegian Competition Authority stated they would have to look at the merger, since the new company would have a near-monopoly on offshore flights. However, the Ministry of Transport and Communications stated that the authority could not hinder the merger, because, by the time new contracts were awarded in 1995, helicopter operators from foreign countries would also be allowed to bid. The ownership of Braathens Helikopter was transferred to Helikopter Service on 14 December. Ludvig G. Braathens Rederi received 14% of the shares in the merged company. They were immediately sold, giving Ludvig G. Braathens Rederi a NOK 170 million profit on the five-year venture. Ludvig G. Braathens Rederi needed the capital to participate in an initial public offering of Braathens. Most of the management of Braathens Helikopter was hired at the newly established competitor United Helicopter, a joint venture between Bristow Helicopters, Leif Höegh & Co and Andreas Ugland & Sønn.

== Destinations ==
The following is a list of Braathens Helikoper's destinations. It includes the name of the location or platform, the aerodrome's ICAO and IATA codes and name.

List of Braathens Helikoper destinations
Location	ICAO	IATA	Airport	Ref
Bergen	BGO	ENBR	Bergen Airport	
Ekofisk	—	ENFA	Ekofisk A	
Ekofisk	—	ENXE	Ekofisk D	
Ekofisk	—	ENXL	Ekofisk K	
Gullfaks	—	ENGC	Gullfaks A	
Gullfaks	—	ENQH	Gullfaks B	
Gullfaks	—	ENGN	Gullfaks C	
Gyda	—	ENXH	Gyda	
Oseberg	—	ENOC	Oseberg A	
Oseberg	—	ENOP	Oseberg C	
Oseberg	—	ENQF	Oseberg Øst	
Oseberg	—	ENQR	Oseberg Sør	
Stavanger	SVG	ENZV	Stavanger Airport	
Ula	—	ENNE	Ula	
Veslefrik	—	ENQG	Veslefrikk A	
Veslefrik	—	ENVH	Veslefrikk B	
Valhall	—	ENXA	Valhall A	
