= NorSea Com 1 =

Submarine communications cable system in the North Sea

NorSea Com-1, now called Tampnet, is a submarine telecommunications cable system in the North Sea linking the UK and Norway, and connecting five off-shore platforms.

It has landing points in:

1. Lowestoft, Suffolk, UK
2. Kårstø, Rogaland, Norway

And connecting the following platforms:

1. Draupner platform, operated by Gassco
2. Ula oil field, operated by BP
3. Ekofisk, operated by ConocoPhillips
4. Valhall oil field, operated by BP
5. Murdoch gas field, operated by ConocoPhillips (now disconnected)

The cable system is owned by Tampnet AS.

Originally, NorSea Com was owned 50% by Telia and 50% by Enitel. After Enitel's bankruptcy in September 2001, Telia acquired the whole cable. In 2011, Tampnet AS acquired 100% of NorSeacom.

Installation started in 1998 and the cable was ready for service in 1999 with an initial capacity of a STM-16 system of 2.5 Gbit/s. Later, Enitel added a 16x10 Gbit/s wavelength-division multiplexing system. The cable contains 24 optical fibers.

NorSea Com-1 has a cable length of about 750 km between Draupner and Lowestoft. Between Draupner and Kårstø (ca 200 km) the system uses fibers in Equinor's submarine cable.

The Tampnet cable was formerly connected to the Murdoch MD installation. The Murdoch field ceased production in 2018 when the Theddlethorpe gas terminal was closed. The cable was subsequently disconnected from MD prior to the installation being removed. The cable was rerouted and remains operational.
