= Norway–UK cable =

Norway–UK cable may refer to:

- HVDC Norway–UK
- NorSea Com 1 (cable system)
