= Roc Oil Company =

Australian petroleum company

Roc Oil Company Limited
- Type: Subsidiary
- Industry: Petroleum
- Founded: 1997
- Founder: John Doran
- Headquarters: Sydney, Australia
- Number of employees: 134 (2023)
- Parent: Fosun International
- Website: www.rocoil.com.au

Roc Oil Company Limited is a petroleum company based in Sydney, Australia. It was established in 1997 as a privately owned company by John Doran. In 1999, the company was listed on the Australian Securities Exchange, and in 2004, was listed on the Alternative Investment Market in London, becoming a cross-listed company. In 2008, Roc Oil merged with Anzon Australia, and in 2014 it was acquired by Fosun International.

Roc has of had oil production facilities in Mauritania, Angola, Malaysia, and China, and in 2013 produced 2.7 million barrels of oil or equivalent products.

== History ==
John Doran was the CEO and founder of Roc Oil Company from 1999 to 2008, ending due to an untimely passing. Doran had extensive experience in both geology as well as being classified as an 'oil man' after large involvement in the expansion of gas exploration and production across Europe, the Middle East and Australia. Proceeding the start-up of Roc Oil Company, Doran was the managing director of Command Petroleum where before departing managed the sale of Command to London Stock Exchange listed company Cairn Energy in 1996.

Following Doran's involvement with Command Petroleum, he started Roc Oil Company in 1996, which was a private startup company with the aim of exploring opportunities for gas and oil exploration, production and development in Australia, Asia, parts of Africa and the Middle East. Up until 1999 the company owned no assets, no working capital, and no partners. In 1999 Roc Oil listed on the Australian Securities Exchange, raising $150 million. Roc Oil utilised these funds to acquire a range of oil and gas assets in East of England and in the North Sea. The core of these assets was the Saltfleetby Gas Field in Lincolnshire, which was underdeveloped later becoming one of the largest onshore gas field in the UK.

In mid-2008 John Doran died after a sudden illness at 62 years of age. Roc Oil's Chief Operating Officer Bruce Clement was appointed as chief executive officer.

== Major Capital Raisings and Mergers & Acquisitions ==
In April 2001, Roc Oil Company made a friendly unsolicited offer to acquire 40% of Gulfstream Resources Canada. The offer was valued at C$28.3 million, however was rejected by the Gulfstream.

To further fuel the next stage of Roc Oil Company's growth Strategy, Roc Oil raised $92 million through a 3 for 5 share rights issue.

Following this capital raise in April, In December Roc Oil announced the sale of 100% of the subsidiary which owned the Saltfleetby Gas Field (acquired in 1999) for $110 million. The sale was estimated to earn Roc Oil 28.5 million pounds after tax profit for 2005. The buyer of the subsidiary was Wingas, a joint venture between Wintershall as well as OAO Gazprom (Russian gas company and one of the largest in the world). The funds earned from the sale will be used to finance ROC's development of the Chinguetti Oil Field, offshore Mauritania and the Cliff Head Oil Field, Offshore Western Australia and other ventures ROC was planning to explore.

In June, ROC began further expanding its presence in Asia by planning to make a move to acquire a 24.5% stake in a China Oil Field off Apache (hydrocarbon explorer).

To refine ROC's focus in terms of geographic operations, the company was planning on selling off its North Sea and Africa assets. ROC had a 12.5% stake in the Blane Oil Field (Located in the North Sea) and because of drilling uncovering mostly dry wells, CEO Bruce Clements stated the company will aim to sell off these assets in order to refocus ROC's efforts in currently occupied territories including Asia and Australia.

ROC became interested in taking over a local crude oil producer in Australia, Anzon. The acquisition would double ROC's crude oil reserves, with ROC having already taken control of 69% of the company and the CEO at the time confident in the offer stating "the deal will happen". In September, the shareholders of the UK located Anzon Energy approved of the $600 million merger with ROC Oil. The merger granted ROC control of 53.1% stake of Anzon Australia.

Prior to Fosun's acquisition of ROC, Horizon Oil announced a proposed merger of equals with ROC. The proposed merger was valued at A$800 million with Horizon shareholders owning 58% of the entity emerging from the merger and ROC shareholders with 42%. The deal aimed to allow ROC to operate in areas which it was not currently present, however would be attractive such as Malaysia and PNG, as larger companies were beginning to exit these areas. As well, the new entity would be able to produce between 15,000 and 20,000 barrels of oil a day approximately until 2030.

However, before the merger process was completed with Horizon, Transcendent Resources (a subsidiary of Fosun International) sent an off-market takeover bid for ROC Oil Company. Subsequently, ROC accepted the offer by Transcendent Resources, stating it offered better synergies and benefits to the be created group over the deal proposed by Horizon as well as offered a better premium over the share price. The ROC Oil Chairman Mike Harding stated, "the proposal to purchase all of ROC's shares for cash is superior when considered against the alternative merger of equals with Horizon and offers a significant premium to share price performance". The final offer by Fosun was A$474 million, paying A$0.69 per ROC Oil Company share, at the time being a 10 percent premium to the current share price and a 23 percent premium to the price prior to the announcement of the offer. Fosun commented on their rationale behind the transaction saying "to enable the group to enter the upstream oil & gas industry and acquire oil & gas assets."

In 2017 ROC executed a share purchase agreement with Triangle (Perth Basin) and Royal Energy to sell of its 42.5% share of Cliff Head Oil Field. Total consideration paid for the share of the oil field was US$3,750,000. The divestment was completed in order to provide cash in the business to invest in other areas of exploration, mainly China.

ROC Oil Company acquired 50% interest in the Ungani Oil Field located in Western Australia as well as 50% interest in the exploration permits from Buru Energy. The compensation paid for both the oil field as well as the exploration permits combined was a maximum of A$84 million. $60 million for the oil field as well as funding 80% of the first A$25 million exploration costs, being a maximum of $20 million.

In June 2019, Hainan Mining acquired a 51% shareholding ROC from Fosun International. In 2023, Hainan Mining acquired the remaining 49%.

On 13 September 2024, Roc Oil Company Pty Limited announced a recommended cash offer to the shareholders of Tethys Oil AB.

== Operations ==
=== Beibu Gulf ===
In 2006 ROC commenced drilling a side-track appraisal well in the Beibu Gulf region, off shore China. in preliminary tests the discovery well unearthed a combined 5,700 b/d of oil from three columns.

ROC Oil continued mining operations in the Beibu Gulf in 2014, drilling two exploration wells finding oil in one of the two wells. The wells were drilled to a depth of 1406 metres, "where the basement granite has been intersected". ROC further drilled a side track to an aggregate depth of 1,265 metres which further confirmed the presence of oil in the very top of the Jiaowei formation. ROC CEO, Alan Linn said the "discovery adds potentially valuable incremental oil to the larger project". The wells were plugged and abandoned on 27 September 2014.

=== Perth ===
In 2007, ROC made a discovery of oil and gas at its Dunsborough well in an offshore Perth Basin which is 37.5% owned by ROC. The Dunsborough well was the third and final well the program which commenced in April 2007. The first well, Frankland discovered gas and the second, Perseverance too discovered gas.

The Frankland well, the first well of the operation located offshore Perth was shortly plugged and abandoned, labelled as a small gas discovery. This was done in support of the companies strategy to target oil. Additionally, the company also said "whether or not an associated oil log is present needs to be evaluated and if an oil leg exists, it is likely to be small".

=== Canning Basin ===
ROC Oil has current operations still in Western Australia, in the canning basin located in the northern region of WA being the Ungani Oil Field. the field is owned 50/50 by Roc Oil Company and Buru Energy Limited and is a producer of oil. the field produces approximately 850 bopd gross crude oil from a total of five wells, This oil is exported to a terminal in Wyndham and stored as well as exported by ship. The first two wells were drilled in 2015, and followed by an additional two in May 2018.

=== Cabinda ===
ROC Oil Company were approved as the operator for the Cabinda Well in Angola in 2001. ROC gained a 45% interest in the onshore block, where more than 4.5 billion barrels (bbl) have already been discovered during the last 40 years. In 2008 the fifth well, Coco discovered oil and associated gas during a test.

However, in later 2008 in October, ROC plugged and abandoned the first appraisal well in Angola. The project was less successful than anticipated, with the five of the seven wells in the drilling program failing to find commercial quantities of oil. While the company did abandon the well, it was announced that the company would plan to re-enter the Angola project, specifically the Coco well in order to test and find oil in the future.
