= Gyda Oil Field =

Oil field in Norway

Gyda
- Location within North Sea
- Country: Norway
- Location: North Sea
- Block: 2/1
- Offshore/onshore: Offshore
- Coordinates: 56°54′41.39″N 3°6′30.39″E
- Operator: Repsol
- Partners: Repsol (61%); INEOS E&P (34%); KUFPEC (5%)

Field history
- Discovery: 1980
- Start of production: 1990
- Abandonment: 2021

Production
- Current production of oil: 10,000 barrels per day (~5.0×10^{5} t/a)
- Recoverable gas: 6.6×10^{9} m^{3} (230×10^{9} cu ft)
- Producing formations: Upper Jurassic

Gyda (Norwegian: Gydafeltet) is an offshore oil field located in the southern Norwegian section of the North Sea, along with the Ula, Tambar and Tambar East fields making up the UGT area, usually attributed to DONG Energy's main areas of exploration and production activity.

The Gyda field was discovered in 1980 and started producing on June 21, 1990. The field contains confirmed 39.6 million m^{3} of oil and 6.6 billion cubic meter of natural gas.Repsol took over the operatorship on behalf of the licence in 2015 upon the acquisition of Talisman Energy's Norwegian assets. Oil production ceased in 2020 and the field was decommissioned in 2021.

== Ownership ==
Originally developed by BP, in 2003 it sold its interests (61%) in the Gyda Oil Field to the Canada-based Talisman Energy for $90 million. Talisman operated the field until it was inherited by Repsol in 2015 as part of the acquisition of Talisman and assumed the operatorship on behalf of the licence. Partners of Talisman Energy, DONG Energy and Norske AEDC AS (NAEDC), owned by Arabian Oil Company (AOC), hold 34% and 5% interest in the project, respectively. Capital spending on Gyda was expected to be $131 million.

== Production ==
Gyda is located in approximately 66 m (217 ft) of water. The main reservoir stands at 4,000 m (13,000 ft) in the Upper Jurassic Ula Formation. The field had one conventional steel facility with production, drilling, living quarters. The topsides were built at various locations in Norway and the steel jacket in the UK. Gyda produced an average of 10,000 bbl/d (1,600 m^{3}/d). The field also produced large quantities of water, helping in making the oil production stable. After many years of dwindling production, the production license was extended until 2020 when the decision was taken to begin decommissioning. A total of 32 wells were drilled during the lifetime of the field. The produced oil was transported by a pipeline to nearby Ekofisk oil field and on to Teesside for refining.

== Gallery ==
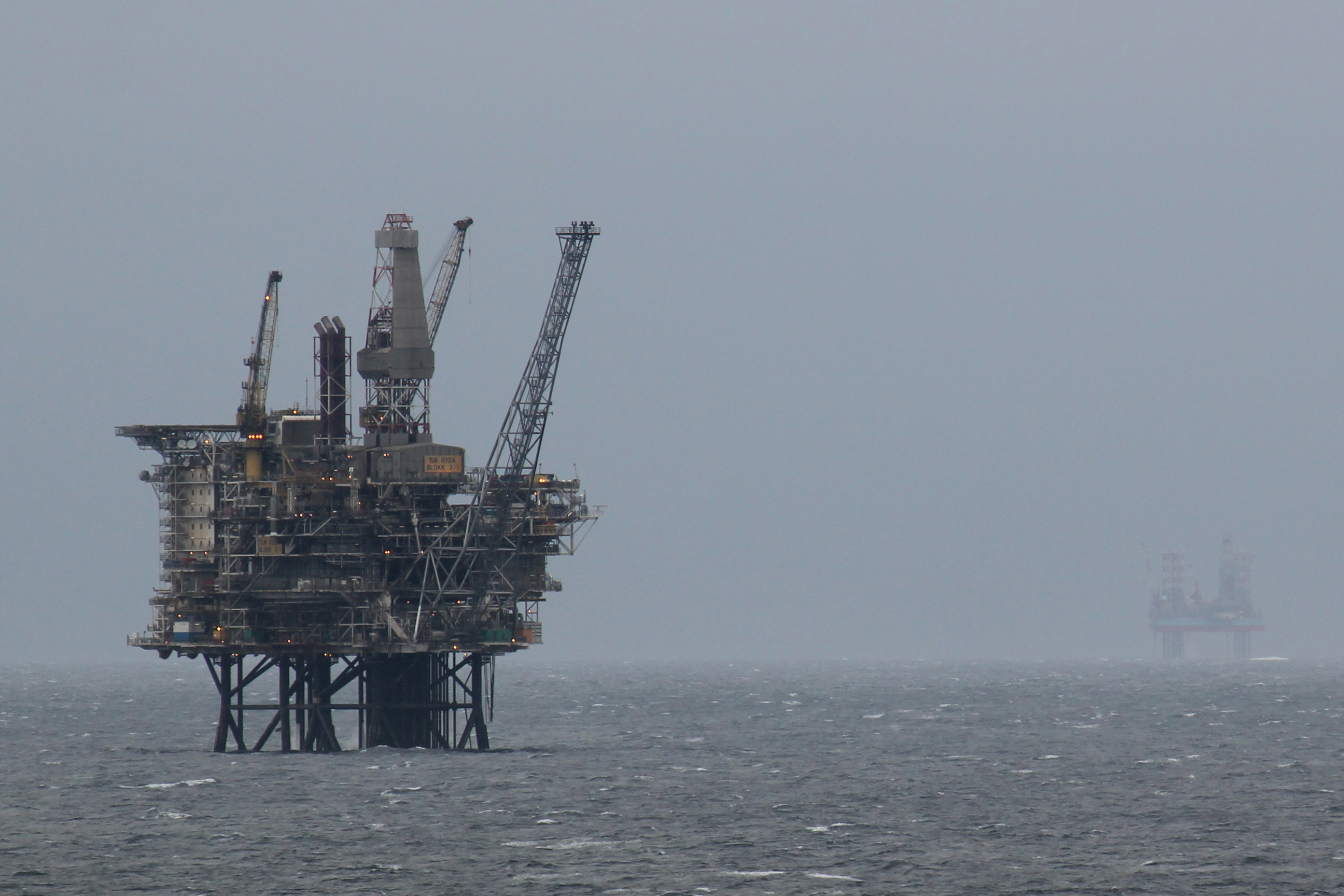
TLM Gyda Blokk 2/1

== See also ==
- Ula oil field
- Oselvar oil field
- Ekofisk oil field
- Norpipe
- North Sea oil
- Economy of Norway
