= Oselvar oil field =

Norwegian oil and gas field in the North Sea

Oselvar
- Location within North Sea
- Country: Norway
- Region: North Sea
- Block: 1/2, 1/3
- Offshore/onshore: Offshore
- Coordinates: 56°55′59″N 2°40′16″E
- Operator: DNO Norge AS
- Partners: DNO Norge AS (55%); Cape Omega AS (45%)

Field history
- Discovery: 1991
- Start of production: November 2011
- Abandonment: April 2018

Production
- Estimated oil in place: 38 million barrels (~5.2×10^{6} t)
- Estimated gas in place: 141×10^{9} cu ft (4.0×10^{9} m^{3})

Oselvar (Norwegian: Oselvarfeltet) is a subsea oil field, abandoned since April 2018, located 250 km (160 mi) southwest of Stavanger in the southern Norwegian section of the North Sea, close to the British border. Oselvar was discovered in 1991. The field is located at 23 kilometres (14 mi) distance from the Ula field to which it was tied back. The original estimated reserves at Oselvar were 38 million barrels of oil and 4 billion cubic metres (140×10^{9} cu ft) of natural gas. The water depth at location is 72 metres (236 ft). In January 2022, DNO ASA reportedly had approval from Norway’s Petroleum Safety Authority (PSA) to remove subsea facilities from the Oselvar field. The Oselvar field installations were to be decommissioned by the end of 2022.

== Ownership ==
DNO Norge AS is since 2019 the formal operator of the field with 55% of interest in the project. Production License 274 which covers the area of the field was given in 2002 to then operator DONG. As per 2020 the only other partner is CapeOmega AS (45%). The total development cost was NOK 4.7 billion.

== Production ==
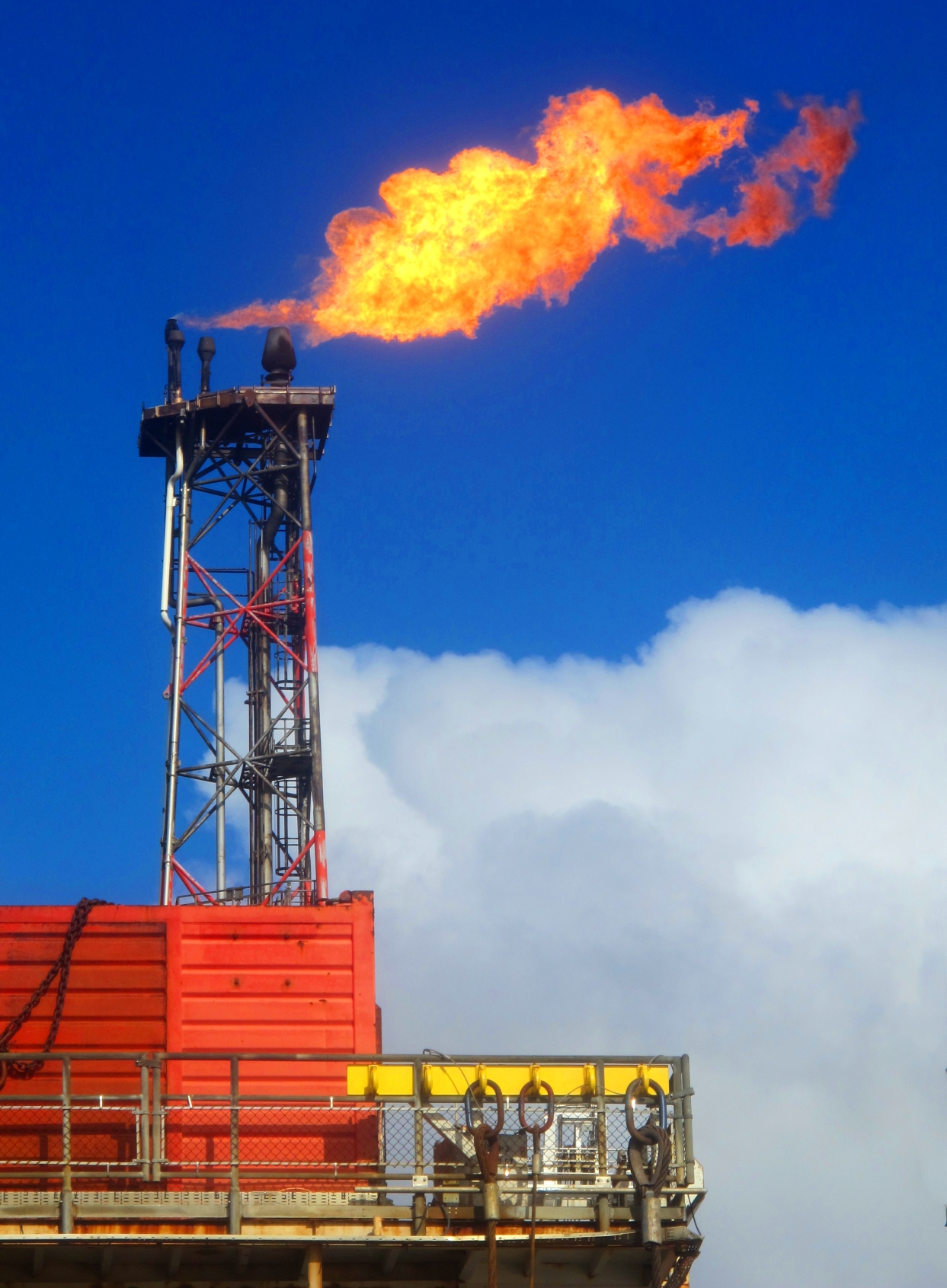
Natural Gas from Oselvar burns on the Ula platform flare on April 14th, 2012

Oselvar was developed with three production wells. Produced oil and gas was transported to the Ula field platform for processing via the Oselvar module. Once processed, the oil was pumped via the Norpipe system to Teesside, UK. Although production was scheduled to start in November 2011, production actually started on April 14, 2012.

== See also ==
- Ula oil field
- Ekofisk oil field
- Norpipe
- North Sea oil
- Economy of Norway
