= DNO ASA =

Norwegian oil and gas operator

- Type: Allmennaksjeselskap
- Traded as: OSE: DNO
- Industry: Petroleum
- Founded: 1971
- Headquarters: Oslo, Norway
- Area served: Worldwide
- Key people: Bjoern Dale (Managing Director); Bijan Mossavar-Rahmani (Executive Chairman)
- Products: Oil and gas exploration and production
- Revenue: US$1.474 billion (2025)
- Operating income: US$512.8 million (2025)
- Net income: US$-25.2 million (2025)
- Total assets: US$5.998 billion (2025)
- Total equity: US$1.329 billion (2025)
- Number of employees: 1.159 (2025)
- Website: www.dno.no

DNO ASA (OSE: DNO) is a Norwegian oil and gas operator focused on the Middle East and the North Sea. Founded in 1971 and listed on the Oslo Stock Exchange, the Company holds stakes in onshore and offshore licenses at various stages of exploration, development and production in the Kurdistan region of Iraq, Norway, the United Kingdom and Yemen.

== About DNO ==
DNO is Norway's oldest oil company and the first to list on the Oslo Stock Exchange in 1981. During the last two decades, the company's focus has shifted from the North Sea to the Middle East region.

In 2004, DNO was the first international oil company to enter the Kurdistan region of Iraq, at a time when the Kurdish region's oil industry was virtually non-existent. The company began production from its flagship Tawke oil field in Kurdistan in 2007 – just two years after the start of exploration activities. The neighboring Peshkabir field was brought on production in 2018.

DNO is now the leading international operator in Kurdistan in terms of production (more than 110,000 barrels of oil per day in 2017) and reserves (the Tawke and Peshkabir fields together hold more than 500 million barrels of proven and probable reserves).

The company also re-entered the North Sea in 2017, acquiring offshore exploration licenses in Norway and the United Kingdom. This has since expanded to include the Norwegian Sea and the Barents Sea.

In April 2024, DNO ASA, with partners including OKEA ASA, announced the advancement of the Brasse field development in the North Sea, with plans for a tie-back to the nearby Brage platform and a projected start of production in the first half of 2027. The field, expected to be renamed Bestla, holds an estimated 24 million barrels of recoverable reserves and could contribute 10,000 boepd net to OKEA at peak production, with operation potentially extending beyond 2031.

== Operations ==
=== Kurdistan region of Iraq ===
DNO entered the region in 2004 and now has a leading position in reserves and production.

=== Norway ===
DNO re-entered Norway in 2017 through the acquisition of Origo Exploration and now holds twenty-one licenses on the Norwegian Continental Shelf.

=== United Kingdom ===
DNO entered the United Kingdom in 2017 through the acquisition of Origo Exploration and now holds three licenses on the UK Continental Shelf.

=== Yemen ===
In 1998, DNO entered Yemen, the company's first foray into the Middle East.

== Assets ==
As of 31 December 2025, DNO held interests in oil and natural gas exploration, development and production activities in Norway, the United Kingdom, Iraqi Kurdistan, the Netherlands and Yemen, as well as an indirect interest in Côte d'Ivoire.

=== Kurdistan, Iraq ===
License	Type	Status	Ownership	Operator	Partners
Tawke PSC	Onshore	Production	75%	DNO Iraq AS	Genel Energy International Limited
Baeshiqa PSC	Onshore	Development	64%	DNO Iraq AS	Turkish Energy Company Limited, KRG

=== Norway ===
License	Type	Status	Ownership	Operator	Partners
PL001 B	Offshore	—	15%	Aker BP ASA	DNO Norge AS, Equinor Energy AS
PL001 E	Offshore	—	15%	Aker BP ASA	DNO Norge AS, Equinor Energy AS
PL006 C (SE Tor)	Offshore	Production	65%	DNO Norge AS	Aker BP ASA
PL018 (Ekofisk)	Offshore	Production	7,6%	ConocoPhillips Skandinavia AS	DNO Norge AS, TotalEnergies EP Norge AS, Vår Energi ASA, Petoro AS
PL019 (Ula)	Offshore	Production	20%	Aker BP ASA	DNO Norge AS
PL019 E (Ula)	Offshore	Production	20%	Aker BP ASA	DNO Norge AS
PL019 F (Ula)	Offshore	Production	45%	Aker BP ASA	DNO Norge AS
PL028 B (Hanz)	Offshore	—	15%	Aker BP ASA	DNO Norge AS, Equinor Energy AS
PL040 (Martin Linge)	Offshore	Production	19%	Equinor Energy AS	DNO Norge AS, Petoro AS
PL043 (Martin Linge)	Offshore	Production	19%	Equinor Energy AS	DNO Norge AS, Petoro AS
PL043 BS (Martin Linge)	Offshore	Production	19%	Equinor Energy AS	DNO Norge AS, Petoro AS
PL048 D (Enoch)	Offshore	—	9,3%	Equinor Energy AS	Petrolia NOCO AS, Aker BP ASA, DNO Norge AS
PL053 B (Brage)	Offshore	Production	14,3%	OKEA ASA	Lime Petroleum AS, DNO Norge AS, Petrolia NOCO AS, M Vest Energy AS
PL055 (Brage)	Offshore	Production	14,3%	OKEA ASA	Lime Petroleum AS, DNO Norge AS, Petrolia NOCO AS, M Vest Energy AS
PL055 B (Brage)	Offshore	Production	14,3%	OKEA ASA	Lime Petroleum AS, DNO Norge AS, Petrolia NOCO AS, M Vest Energy AS
PL055 D (Brage)	Offshore	Production	14,3%	OKEA ASA	Lime Petroleum AS, DNO Norge AS, Petrolia NOCO AS, M Vest Energy AS
PL055 E (Brage)	Offshore	Production	14,3%	OKEA ASA	Lime Petroleum AS, DNO Norge AS, Petrolia NOCO AS, M Vest Energy AS
PL055 FS (Brage)	Offshore	Production	14,3%	OKEA ASA	Lime Petroleum AS, DNO Norge AS, Petrolia NOCO AS, M Vest Energy AS
PL065 (Tambar)	Offshore	Production	45%	Aker BP ASA	DNO Norge AS
PL065 B (Tambar)	Offshore	Production	45%	Aker BP ASA	DNO Norge AS
PL090 C	Offshore	—	25%	Harbour Energy Norge AS	DNO Norge AS, Vår Energi ASA, Inpex Idemitsu Petroleum Norge AS
PL122 (Marulk)	Offshore	Production	37%	DNO Norge AS	Equinor Energy AS, Orlen Upstream Norway AS
PL122 B (Marulk)	Offshore	Production	37%	DNO Norge AS	Equinor Energy AS, Orlen Upstream Norway AS
PL122 C (Marulk)	Offshore	Production	37%	DNO Norge AS	Equinor Energy AS, Orlen Upstream Norway AS
PL122 D (Marulk)	Offshore	Production	37%	DNO Norge AS	Equinor Energy AS, Orlen Upstream Norway AS
PL127 (Verdande)	Offshore	Development/Production	25%	Equinor Energy AS	Japex Norge AS, DNO Norge AS
PL127 DS (Verdande)	Offshore	Development/Production	56%	DNO Norge AS	Japex Norge AS
PL128 (Nome)	Offshore	Production	14,8%	Equinor Energy AS	Petoro AS, DNO Norge AS
PL128 B (Nome)	Offshore	Production	6,9%	Equinor Energy AS	Petoro AS, DNO Norge AS
PL128 D (Nome)	Offshore	Production	14,8%	Equinor Energy AS	Petoro AS, DNO Norge AS
PL128 E (Nome)	Offshore	Production	14,8%	Equinor Energy AS	Petoro AS, DNO Norge AS
PL147 (Trym)	Offshore	Production	100%	DNO Norge AS	—
PL147 B (Trym)	Offshore	Production	100%	DNO Norge AS	—
PL159 B (Alve)	Offshore	Production	32%	Equinor Energy AS	DNO Norge AS, Orlen Upstream Norway AS
PL159 G (Alve)	Offshore	Production	32%	Equinor Energy AS	DNO Norge AS, Orlen Upstream Norway AS
PL167 (Symra)	Offshore	Development	20%	Aker BP ASA	Equinor Energy AS, DNO Norge AS
PL167 B (Symra)	Offshore	Development	20%	Aker BP ASA	Equinor Energy AS, DNO Norge AS
PL167 C (Symra)	Offshore	Development	20%	Aker BP ASA	Equinor Energy AS, DNO Norge AS
PL185 (Brage)	Offshore	Production	14,3%	OKEA ASA	Lime Petroleum AS, DNO Norge AS, Petrolia NOCO AS, M Vest Energy AS
PL193 (Kvitebjørn)	Offshore	Production	19%	Equinor Energy AS	DNO Norge AS, Petoro AS, Orlen Upstream Norway AS, TotalEnergies EP Norge
PL193 C (Kvitebjørn)	Offshore	Production	19%	Equinor Energy AS	DNO Norge AS, Petoro AS, Orlen Upstream Norway AS, TotalEnergies EP Norge
PL211 (Dvalin)	Offshore	Production	10%	Harbour Energy Norge AS	DNO Norge AS, Petoro AS
PL242 (Ivar Aasen)	Offshore	Production	15%	Aker BP ASA	DNO Norge AS, Equinor Energy AS, OKEA ASA, M Vest Energy AS
PL242 B (Ivar Aasen)	Offshore	Production	15%	Aker BP ASA	DNO Norge AS, Equinor Energy AS, OKEA ASA, M Vest Energy AS
PL248 F (Vega)	Offshore	Production	20%	Harbour Energy Norge AS	Petoro AS, DNO Norge AS
PL248 GS (Vega)	Offshore	Production	20%	Harbour Energy Norge AS	Petoro AS, DNO Norge AS
PL248 K (Vega)	Offshore	Production	20%	Harbour Energy Norge AS	Petoro AS, DNO Norge AS
PL293 B	Offshore	—	20%	Equinor Energy AS	DNO Norge AS, Japex Norge AS, Inpex Idemitsu Petroleum Norge AS
PL293 CS	Offshore	—	29%	Equinor Energy AS	DNO Norge AS, Japex Norge AS, Inpex Idemitsu Petroleum Norge AS
PL300 (Tambar Øst)	Offshore	Development	45%	Aker BP ASA	DNO Norge AS
PL375	Offshore	—	20%	Equinor Energy AS	DNO Norge AS, Vår Energi ASA, Petoro AS
PL378	Offshore	—	12,1%	Harbour Energy Norge AS	DNO Norge AS, Pandion Energy AS
PL405 (Oda)	Offshore	Production	85%	Aker BP ASA	DNO Norge AS
PL418 (Nova)	Offshore	Development	45%	Harbour Energy Norge AS	DNO Norge AS, OKEA ASA, Pandion Energy AS
PL418 B (Nova)	Offshore	Development	45%	Harbour Energy Norge AS	DNO Norge AS, OKEA ASA, Pandion Energy AS
PL435 (Dvalin)	Offshore	Production	10%	Harbour Energy Norge AS	DNO Norge AS, Petoro AS
PL475 BS (Maria)	Offshore	Production	20%	Harbour Energy Norge AS	DNO Norge AS, Petoro AS
PL475 CS (Maria)	Offshore	Production	20%	Harbour Energy Norge AS	DNO Norge AS, Petoro AS
PL586 (Fenja)	Offshore	Production	25%	Vår Energi ASA	DNO Norge AS
PL586 B (Fenja)	Offshore	Production	25%	Vår Energi ASA	DNO Norge AS
PL636 (Duva)	Offshore	Production	10%	Vår Energi ASA	DNO Norge AS, Inpex Idemitsu Norge AS, Orlen Upstream Norway AS
PL636 B (Duva)	Offshore	Production	10%	Vår Energi ASA	DNO Norge AS, Inpex Idemitsu Norge AS, Orlen Upstream Norway AS
PL636 C (Duva)	Offshore	Production	10%	Vår Energi ASA	DNO Norge AS, Inpex Idemitsu Norge AS, Orlen Upstream Norway AS
PL636 D (Duva)	Offshore	Production	10%	Vår Energi ASA	DNO Norge AS, Inpex Idemitsu Norge AS, Orlen Upstream Norway AS
PL644 (Berling)	Offshore	Development	30%	OMV (Norge) AS	Equinor Energy AS, DNO Norge AS
PL644 B (Berling)	Offshore	Development	30%	OMV (Norge) AS	Equinor Energy AS, DNO Norge AS
PL644 C (Berling)	Offshore	Development	30%	OMV (Norge) AS	Equinor Energy AS, DNO Norge AS
PL644 D (Berling)	Offshore	Development	30%	OMV (Norge) AS	Equinor Energy AS, DNO Norge AS
PL740 (Bestla)	Offshore	Development	39,3%	OKEA ASA	DNO Norge AS, Lime Petroleum AS, M Vest Energy AS
PL827 S	Offshore	—	49%	Equinor Energy AS	DNO Norge AS
PL827 SB	Offshore	—	49%	Equinor Energy AS	DNO Norge AS
PL836 S	Offshore	—	30%	Harbour Energy Norge AS	DNO Norge AS, Equinor Energy AS
PL836 SB	Offshore	—	30%	Harbour Energy Norge AS	DNO Norge AS, Equinor Energy AS
PL923	Offshore	—	20%	Equinor Energy AS	DNO Norge AS, Petoro AS
PL923 B	Offshore	—	20%	Equinor Energy AS	DNO Norge AS, Petoro AS
PL929	Offshore	—	10%	Vår Energi ASA	Harbour Energy AS, Pandion Energy Norge AS, Aker BP ASA, DNO Norge AS
PL956	Offshore	—	15%	Vår Energi ASA	DNO Norge AS, Aker BP ASA
PL984	Offshore	—	30%	DNO Norge AS	Vår Energi ASA, Source Energy AS, Equinor Energy AS, Aker BP ASA
PL1049	Offshore	—	40%	DNO Norge AS	Concedo AS, Petoro AS
PL1085	Offshore	—	25%	Aker BP ASA	DNO Norge AS, Petoro AS
PL1086	Offshore	Exploration	50%	DNO Norge AS	Aker BP ASA, Petoro AS, Source Energy AS
PL1102	Offshore	—	30%	OKEA ASA	DNO Norge AS, Aker BP ASA, Equinor Energy AS
PL1102 B	Offshore	—	30%	OKEA ASA	DNO Norge AS, Aker BP ASA, Equinor Energy AS
PL1102 C	Offshore	—	30%	Equinor Energy AS	DNO Norge AS, Aker BP ASA
PL1108	Offshore	—	40%	DNO Norge AS	OKEA ASA, Pandion Energy AS
PL1109	Offshore	—	20%	OMV (Norge) AS	Aker BP ASA, DNO Norge AS, Pandion Energy AS, OKEA ASA
PL1113	Offshore	—	30%	OKEA ASA	DNO Norge AS
PL1119	Offshore	—	10%	Equinor Energy AS	Inpex Idemitsu Norge AS, OKEA ASA, DNO Norge AS
PL1121	Offshore	—	30%	Equinor Energy AS	DNO Norge AS, Vår Energi ASA
PL1135	Offshore	Exploration	20%	Orlen Upstream Norway AS	DNO Norge AS, Source Energy AS
PL1147	Offshore	—	20%	Aker BP ASA	DNO Norge AS, Equinor Energy AS
PL1148	Offshore	—	30%	Wellesley Petroleum AS	DNO Norge AS, Equinor Energy AS, Aker BP ASA
PL1148 B	Offshore	—	30%	Wellesley Petroleum AS	DNO Norge AS, Equinor Energy AS, Aker BP ASA
PL1148 CS	Offshore	—	30%	Wellesley Petroleum AS	DNO Norge AS, Equinor Energy AS, Aker BP ASA
PL1150 S	Offshore	—	40%	OKEA ASA	DNO Norge AS
PL1151	Offshore	—	20%	Harbour Energy Norge AS	Aker BP ASA, DNO Norge AS, Pandion Energy AS, Equinor Energy AS
PL1151 B	Offshore	—	20%	Harbour Energy Norge AS	Aker BP ASA, DNO Norge AS, Pandion Energy AS, Equinor Energy AS
PL1158	Offshore	—	40%	Aker BP ASA	DNO Norge AS, Equinor Energy AS
PL1171	Offshore	—	34%	Aker BP ASA	DNO Norge AS
PL1172	Offshore	—	30%	Aker BP ASA	DNO Norge AS, Orlen Upstream Norway AS
PL1175	Offshore	—	20%	Aker BP ASA	DNO Norge AS, Orlen Upstream Norway AS
PL1175 B	Offshore	—	30%	Aker BP ASA	DNO Norge AS, Orlen Upstream Norway AS
PL1177	Offshore	—	—	Equinor Energy AS	DNO Norge AS, OMV (Norge) AS
PL1182 S	Offshore	Exploration	40%	DNO Norge AS	Aker BP ASA, Concedo AS
PL1185	Offshore	—	20%	Equinor Energy AS	DNO Norge AS, Aker BP ASA, Vår Energi ASA
PL1186	Offshore	—	20%	Equinor Energy AS	DNO Norge AS, Harbour Energy Norge AS, OKEA ASA
PL1198	Offshore	—	20%	Aker BP ASA	DNO Norge AS, Petoro AS, Source Energy AS
PL1198 B	Offshore	—	20%	Aker BP ASA	DNO Norge AS, Petoro AS, Source Energy AS
PL1203	Offshore	—	20%	Vår Energi ASA	Equinor Energy AS, DNO Norge AS, Petoro AS
PL1204	Offshore	—	40%	DNO Norge AS	Equinor Energy AS
PL1204 BS	Offshore	—	60%	DNO Norge AS	Equinor Energy AS
PL1205	Offshore	—	40%	ConocoPhillips Skandinavia AS	DNO Norge AS
PL1209	Offshore	—	40%	DNO Norge AS	Concedo AS, Equinor Energy AS
PL1212 S	Offshore	—	40%	Equinor Energy AS	DNO Norge AS, Aker BP ASA
PL1213 S	Offshore	—	30%	Vår Energi ASA	DNO Norge AS, Harbour Energy Norge AS
PL1216	Offshore	—	40%	DNO Norge AS	Harbour Energy Norge AS, Source Energy AS
PL1225 S	Offshore	—	20%	Harbour Energy Norge AS	DNO Norge AS, Petoro AS
PL1226	Offshore	—	40%	Equinor Energy AS	DNO Norge AS
PL1228	Offshore	—	30%	OMV (Norge) AS	Equinor Energy AS, DNO Norge AS
PL1244	Offshore	—	60%	DNO Norge AS	Aker BP ASA
PL1245	Offshore	—	—	Aker BP ASA	DNO Norge AS, Petoro AS
PL1251	Offshore	—	50%	DNO Norge AS	Concedo AS
PL1255	Offshore	—	20%	Wellesley Petroleum AS	Equinor Energy AS, DNO Norge AS, OKEA ASA
PL1258	Offshore	—	40%	Petrolia NOCO AS	DNO Norge AS
PL1260	Offshore	—	35%	Vår Energi ASA	DNO Norge AS, OKEA ASA
PL1267	Offshore	—	50%	DNO Norge AS	OKEA ASA, M Vest Energy AS
PL1270	Offshore	—	100%	DNO Norge AS	—
PL1271 S	Offshore	—	25%	Aker BP ASA	DNO Norge AS, Equinor Energy AS
PL1273	Offshore	—	—	Petrolia NOCO AS	DNO Norge AS

=== United Kingdom ===
License	Type	Status	Ownership	Operator	Partners
P111	Offshore	Production	54,3%	Repsol Sinopec Resources UK Ltd	DNO North Sea (U.K.) Ltd, DNO North Sea (ROGB) Ltd, Dana Petroleum (BVUK) Ltd
P219	Offshore	Production	18,2%	Repsol Sinopec North Sea Ltd	DNO North Sea (ROGB) Ltd, Dana Petroleum (BVUK) Ltd, Waldorf Production UK Ltd
P255	Offshore	Production	45%	Shell U.K. Ltd	DNO North Sea (U.K.) Ltd, Spirit Energy Resources Ltd
P1720 (Arran)	Offshore	Production	50%	Rockrose UKCS4 Ltd	DNO North Sea (U.K.) Ltd
P2543	Offshore	Development	50%	DNO North Sea (U.K.) Ltd	Aker BP UK Ltd
P359 Area A (Arran)	Offshore	Production	18,9%	Shell U.K. Ltd	DNO North Sea (U.K.) Ltd, Rockrose UKCS4 Ltd
P359 Area B (Arran)	Offshore	Production	18,9%	Shell U.K. Ltd	DNO North Sea (U.K.) Ltd, Rockrose UKCS4 Ltd

=== Netherlands ===
License	Type	Status	Ownership	Operator	Partners
D18a	Offshore	Production/Decommissioning	2,5%	Neptune E&P UKCS Ltd	DNO North Sea (U.K.) Ltd, Ineos UK SNS Ltd, Premier Oil E&P UK Ltd

=== Yemen ===
License	Type	Status	Ownership	Operator	Partners
Block 47	Onshore	Suspended	64%	DNO Yemen AS	The Yemen Company, Geopetrol Hadramaut Incorporated

=== Côte d'Ivoire ===
License	Type	Status	Ownership	Operator	Partners
Block CI-27	Offshore	Production/Exploration	9% indirect	Foxtrot International LDC	SECI SA, Petroci

== Board of directors ==
=== Bijan Mossavar-Rahmani - Executive Chairman ===
Bijan Mossavar-Rahmani is an experienced oil and gas executive and has served as DNO's Executive Chairman of the Board of Directors since 2011. Mr. Mossavar-Rahmani serves concurrently as Executive Chairman of Oslo-listed RAK Petroleum plc, DNO's largest shareholder. He is a member of the nomination and remuneration committees.

=== Lars Arne Takla - Deputy Chairman ===
Lars Arne Takla has extensive experience from various managerial, executive and board positions in the international oil and gas industry. He was elected to DNO's Board of Directors in 2012 and is a member of the HSSE committee.

=== Elin Karfjell - Director ===
Elin Karfjell is Managing Partner of Aelika AS and has held various management positions across a broad range of industries. Ms. Karfjell was elected to DNO's Board of Directors in 2015 and is a member of the audit committee.

=== Gunnar Hirsti - Director ===
Gunnar Hirsti has executive experience from various managerial, executive and board positions in the oil and gas industry as well as the information technology industry in Norway. He was elected to DNO's Board of Directors in 2007 and is a member of the audit and remuneration committees.

=== Shelley Watson - Director ===
Shelley Watson began her career as a reservoir surveillance and facilities engineer with Esso Australia in its offshore Bass Strait operation. She has served on DNO's Board of Directors since 2010 and is a member of the audit committee.

== Criticism from the National Contact Point ==
The Norwegian National Contact Point concluded in 2018 that DNO had not met the expectations expressed in the OECD Guidelines on prior notice and consultation with the employees of DNO Yemen in connection with suspension of the company's Yemeni operations in 2015. The key issue in the complaint concerned lack of prior notice and consultation between DNO and the employee representatives in Yemen in connection with collective dismissals and suspension of production in the war-like situation that prevailed in 2015. The complaint also concerned the question of whether DNO had obstructed the workers’ right to organize and collective bargaining in Yemen, and the validity of dismissals as part of the downsizing process.

Industri Energi had for some time tried to help the workers of DNO Yemen after having received desperate appeals from the workers who were sacked by text messages and e-mails when the company withdrew from the country, and not been given the wages and benefits they were entitled to. Still the workers have not received the compensation they legally are entitled to according to court decisions in Yemen.
