= Valhall oil field =

Norwegian oil field

Valhall
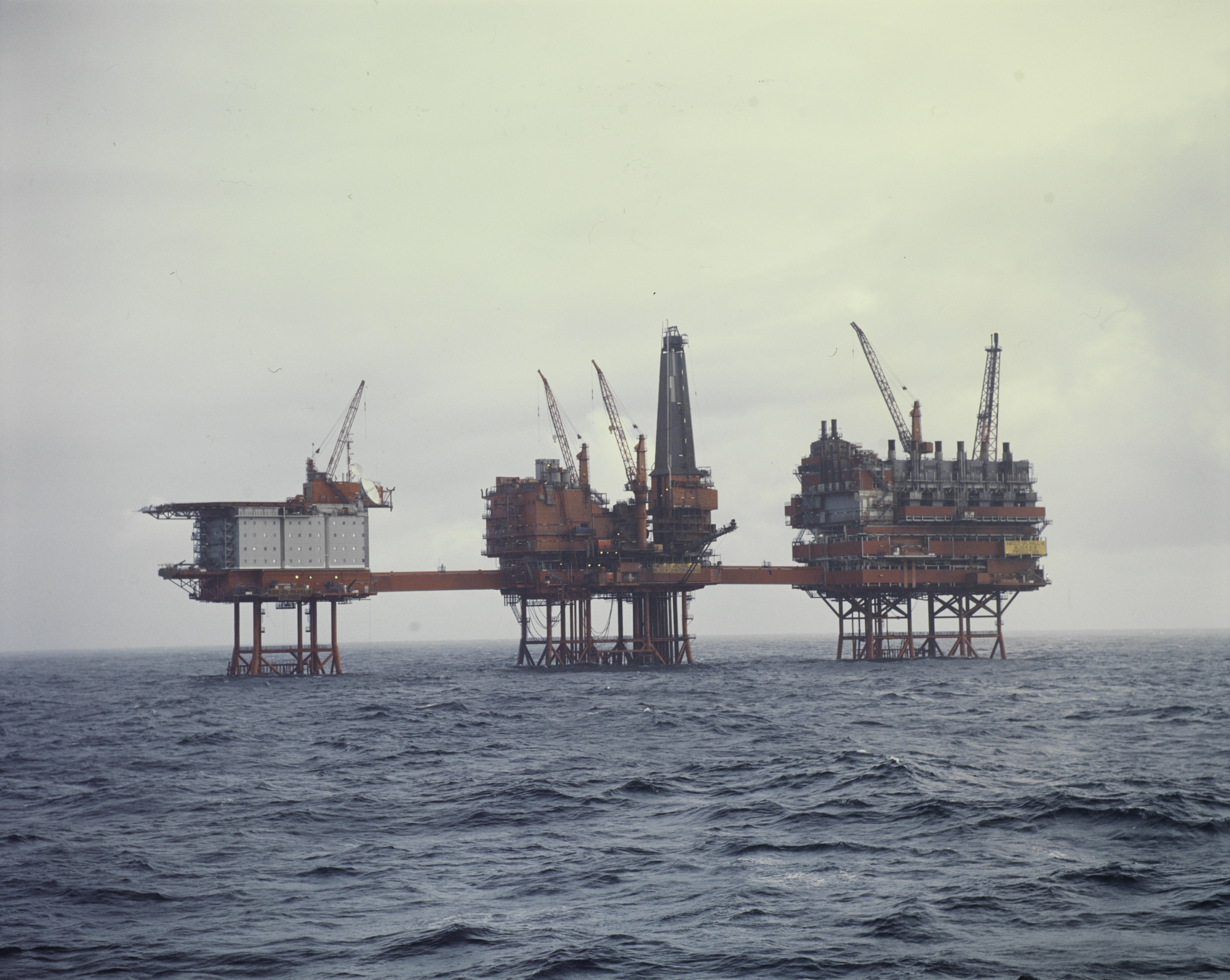
- Valhall A oil platforms

- Location within North Sea
- Country: Norway
- Location: Central North Sea
- Block: 2/8,2/11
- Offshore/onshore: offshore
- Coordinates: 56°16′41.3904″N 3°23′43.1916″E
- Operator: Aker BP
- Partners: Aker BP 90.0% Pandion Energy 10.0%

Field history
- Discovery: 1975
- Start of development: 1981
- Start of production: 1982

Production
- Current production of oil: 8,000 barrels per day (~4.0×10^{5} t/a)
- Producing formations: Tor Formation, Hod Formation

Valhall is an oil field in the Norwegian sector of the North Sea. Discovered in 1975, production began in 1982 and is expected to continue until 2050. Valhall is located in 70 metres of water. It produces from chalk in the Tor and Hod Formations of Late Cretaceous age. The reservoir depth is approximately 2,400 metres.

== Development ==
The field was originally developed with three facilities (QP, DP and PCP) but now the complex consists of five separate steel platforms that are bridge-connected. There are also two unmanned flank platforms, one in the south and one in the north, both around 6 kilometres from the field centre.

=== Quarters Platform (QP) ===
The QP was built in 1979 and started being used in July 1981. It was bridge-linked to PCP. It had accommodation for 208 people. This module is undergoing deconstruction at the demolition yard in Leirvik, NOR.

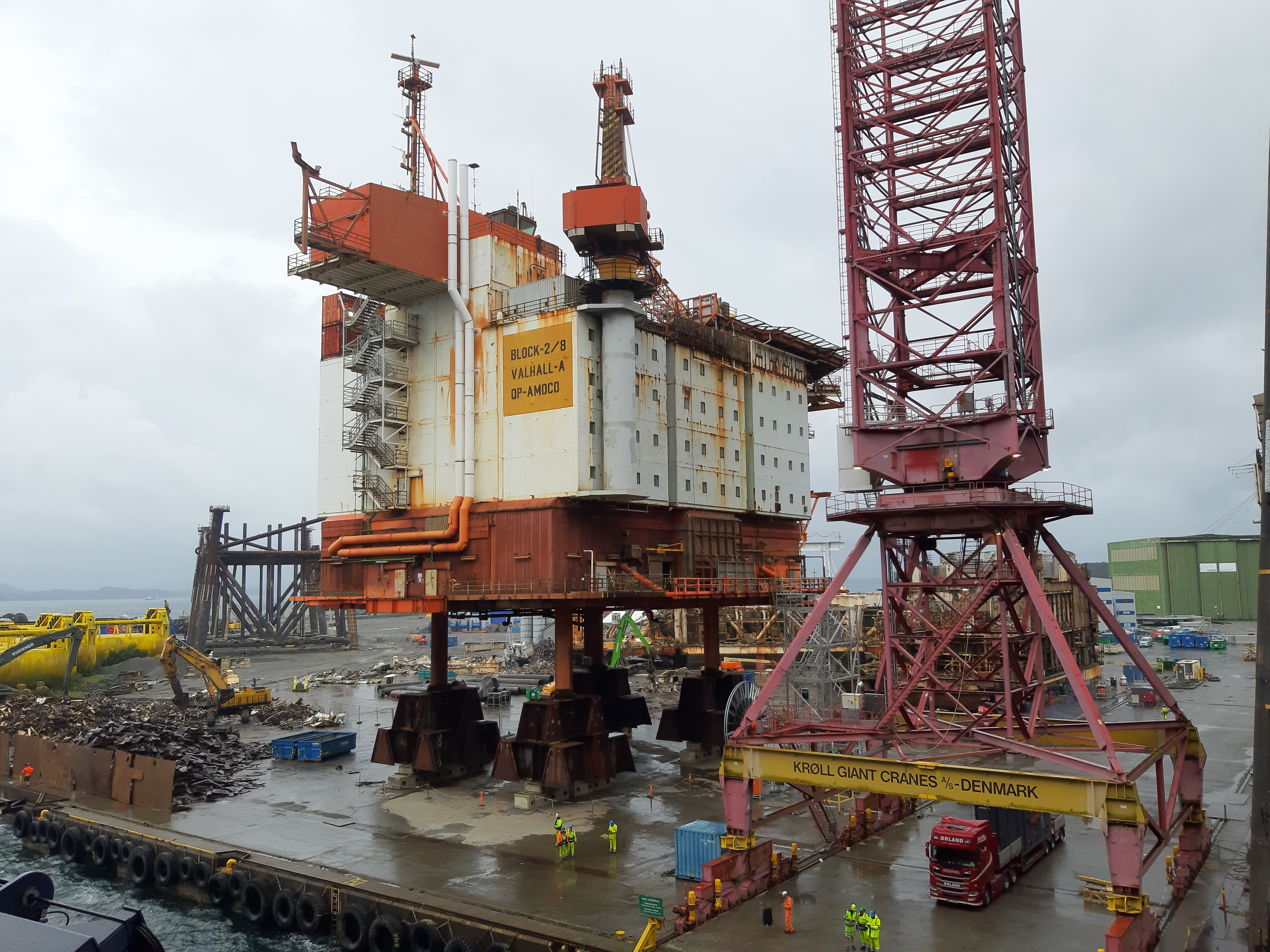
VALHALL-A Quarters Platform (QP)

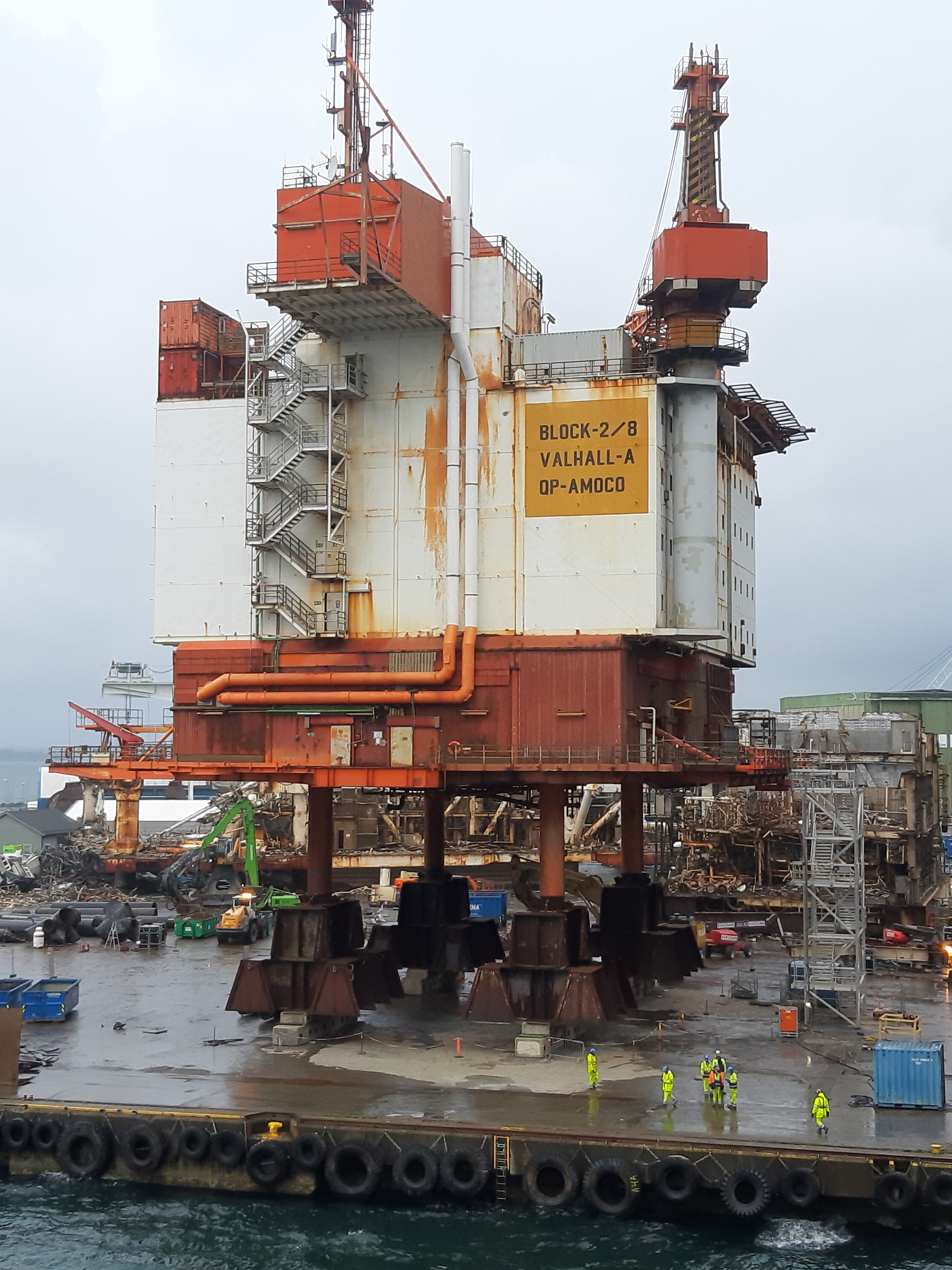
VALHALL-A Quarters Platform (QP)

=== Drilling Platform (DP) ===
The DP is situated centrally and has 30 well slots. The platform started operation on 17 December 1981 with the first covered derrick. It was bridge-linked to PCP.

=== Production Platform (PCP) ===
The PCP is built to process 168,000 barrels (26,700 m^{3}) of oil and 350 million cubic feet (9,900,000 m^{3}) of gas per day. The platform is 65 metres high and weighs 21,000 tons. The oil production is piped to 2/4-J at the Ekofisk Center and goes to Teesside in England. The gas is transported directly via the Norpipe pipeline to Emden in Germany. The platform also processes oil and gas that comes from the Hod oil field.

=== Riser Platform (RP) ===
The RP (Ekofisk 2/4 G) was installed in April and June 1981. It received oil and gas from PCP through two 36.8 km long 20-inch diameter pipelines. It delivered the oil and gas to Ekofisk Tank to which it was bridge linked.

=== Wellhead Platform (WP) ===
The WP was installed in April 1996 and first oil production started in June the same year. WP has 19 well slots. A central location and spare available capacity make it possible for the Valhall complex to also receive oil and gas from several adjacent fields.

=== Water Injection Platform (WP) ===
The WIP is a fixed steel platform, bridge linked to the existing Valhall WP. Water injection is expected to increase oil recovery from 31% to 38%. The integrated topsides has water injection facilities, seawater and produced water treatment facilities and power generation. The platform-based drilling rig's configuration allows for drilling and maintenance of wells on the new platform (24 wells total) and on the existing WP platform (19 wells total). The IP has integrated connections to the onshore operating centre.

=== Valhall Flank Development (VFD) ===
The VFD consists of two identical unmanned wellhead platforms each equipped with 16 drilling slots and located about 6 km (one to the North and one to the South) from the existing Valhall Facilities where wellstreams will be processed.

Initially about eight wells will be drilled from each platform. There is room for future water injection at either wellhead platform. The two wellhead platforms are powered from Valhall and monitored from the existing Valhall facilities via a fiber optic cable.

Drilling commenced on the South Flank by West Epsilon in October 2002 and continued until August 2003 when it moved to drill the North Flank. The South Flank started production 8 May 2003. While the North Flank came on stream 7 January 2004.

== New field centre ==
Due to subsidence of the field centre and a desire to operate more efficiently, a new field centre is being developed for Valhall. The new field centre will probably extend the life of the field to 2050.

=== Production & Hotel (PH) Facility ===
The PH facility is an integrated processing and accommodation platform, with a power from shore module and bridges linking it to the existing Valhall platforms. The topsides weigh 18,500 tonnes, the jacket structure weighs 8,400 tonnes and there are 180 single cabins on the platform.

Front-end engineering and design work was undertaken by Fabricom and Wood Group, with the deck constructed by Heerema. The ten-storey living quarters module was constructed by SLP Engineering, with Alphastrut supplying a lightweight aluminium support system. The steel jacket substructure was fabricated and installed by Kværner.

The steel jacket for the PH platform was installed in June 2009, with the main deck and living quarters module added in July 2010 and the power from shore module becoming operational in June 2011. Production from the PH platform commenced in January 2013 and is expected to reach 65,000 barrels of oil a day.

== See also ==
- List of oil fields
