= Ula oil field =

Norwegian oil field in the North Sea

Ula
- Location within North Sea
- Country: Norway
- Location/block: 7/12-2
- Offshore/onshore: Offshore
- Coordinates: 57°6′41.15″N 2°50′50.39″E
- Operator: AkerBP AS
- Partners: AkerBP AS (80%), Dong Norge AS (20%)

Field history
- Discovery: 1976
- Start of production: 1986
- Abandonment: 2028

Production
- Current production of oil: 10,000 barrels per day (~5.0×10^{5} t/a)
- Estimated oil in place: 18.1 million barrels (~2.47×10^{6} t)
- Producing formations: Upper Jurassic

Ula (Norwegian: Ulafeltet) is an offshore oil field located in the southern Norwegian section of North Sea along with Gyda, Tambar and Tambar East fields making up the UGT area, usually attributed to DONG Energy's main areas of exploration and production activity.

The Ula field was discovered in 1976 and came online in October 1986. It contains confirmed 69.98 million m^{3} of oil and 2.5 million of NGL.

== Ownership ==
AkerBP is the operator of the field with 80% of interest in the project. AkerBP's partner DONG Energy holds 20% of interest. DONG Energy increased its initial share of 5% to 20% by acquiring Svenska Petroleum's complete share of 15% for US$130 million in 2008.

== Production ==
Ula is located in approximately 70 m (230 ft) of water. The main reservoir stands at 3,345 m (10,974 ft) in the Upper Jurassic Ula Formation. The field has three conventional steel facilities with production, drilling and living quarters. It has 7 production and 2 water injection wells. Current production at Ula field is 10,000 bbl/d. The existing gas process plant was recently extended with a new module, turbine and compressor and has been operative since 2008. The gas from Blane field is injected into the Ula reservoir for production. The gas produced at Ula field is re-injected into the field for increased oil recovery as well. The field is expected to be abandoned in 2028. The produced oil is then transported by a pipeline to Ekofisk oil field and on to Teesside for refining. In 2009, Aker Solutions was awarded a contract to tieback Ula field to Oselvar field, with work commencing in 2011. Once complete, the oil from DONG-operated Oselvar field would be pumped 24 kilometres (15 mi) away to Ula facilities for processing.

== See also ==
- Norpipe
- North Sea oil
- Economy of Norway
