= Fiskeler =

Geologic locality in Denmark

Fiskeler Member
- Stratigraphic range: Danian; ~66.086–65 Ma
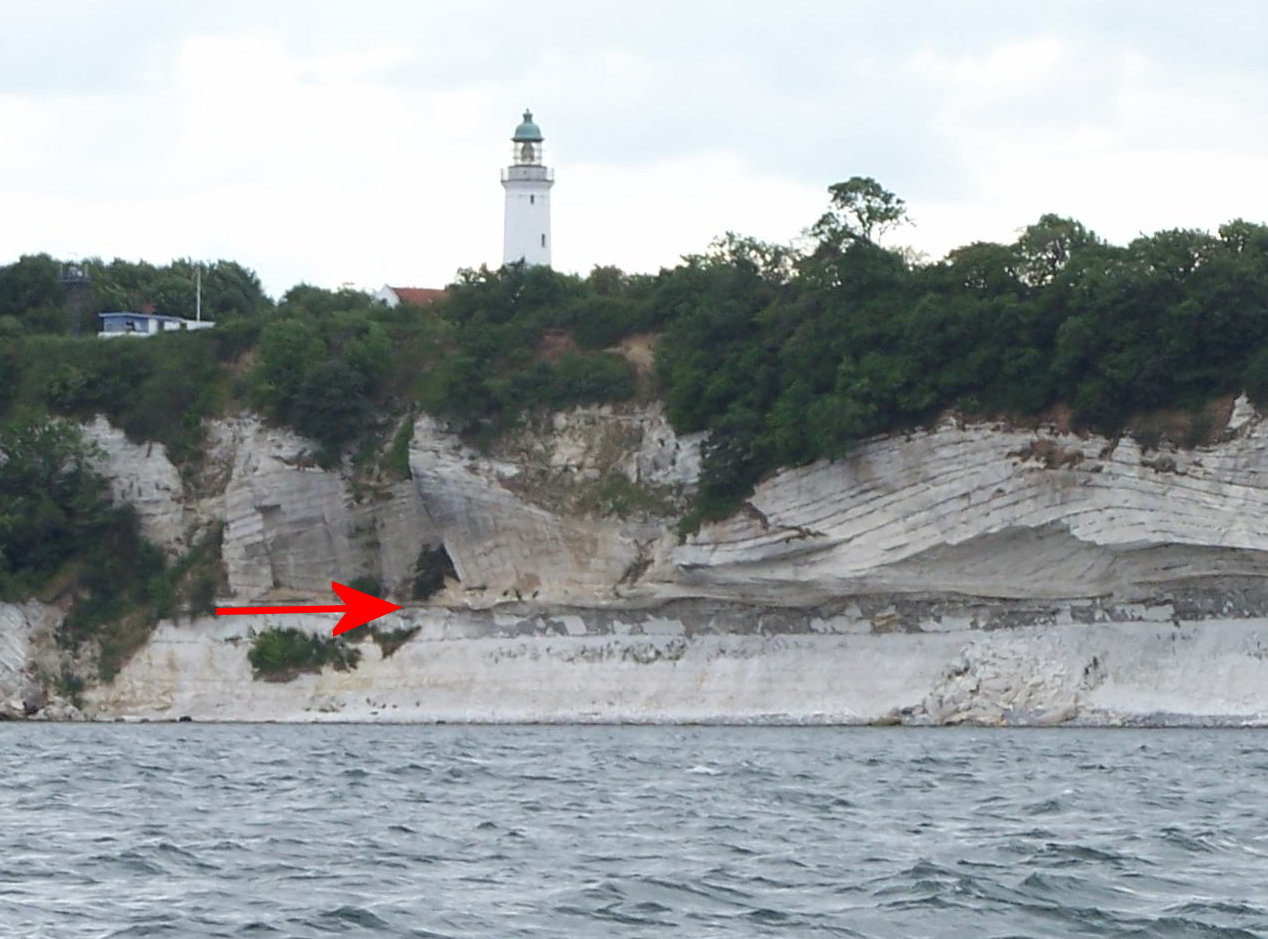
- The location of the fiskeler is indicated by the arrow
- Type: Geologic locality
- Unit of: Rødvig Formation
- Underlies: Cerithium Limestone Member
- Overlies: Tor Formation
- Thickness: 5 centimetres (2.0 in) to 10 centimetres (3.9 in)

Lithology
- Primary: Marl
- Other: Iridium

Location
- Region: Zealand
- Country: Denmark
- Extent: Stevns Klint

Type section
- Named for: Abundance of preserved fish scales and teeth
- Named by: Johan Georg Forchhammer
- Year defined: 1826

The Fiskeler Member (lit. 'Fish Clay Member') of the Rødvig Formation is a notable geologic locality deposited during the Cretaceous–Paleogene boundary and the earliest part of the Danian (early Paleocene; c. 66.086 to 65 Ma). It is known from exposures at Stevns Klint in Denmark.

== History ==
The fiskeler was discovered by Søren Abildgaard in 1759 and was named fiskeler by Johan Georg Forchhammer in 1826 before being described by Richard Taylor and Richard Phillips in 1827. Charles Lyell noted the absence of fossils in 1835, while Forchhammer was able to locate fossils at the site in 1849, using the name fiskeler for the first time in published literature.

It was linked to the Cretaceous–Paleogene boundary during 1980 as a reference point for the stratigraphy and iridium content from the Chixculub impactor which struck Mexico.

== Geology ==
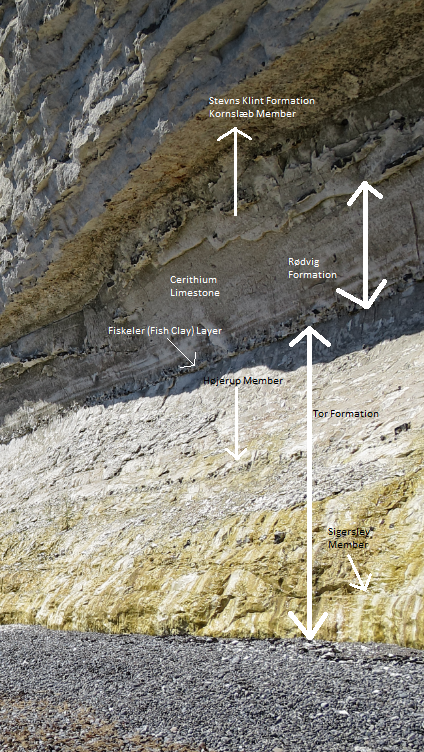
The three fossil formations of Stevns Klint, with the fiskeler in the middle

The dark marl layer of fiskeler, mainly five to ten centimeters thick, clearly marks the Cretaceous–Paleogene boundary and overlies the Maastrichtian age Tor Formation as an unconformity. The fiskeler is enriched in iridium, a fact used as an argument for the Alvarez hypothesis that the worldwide Cretaceous–Paleogene mass extinction was caused by the impact of an asteroid. It also suggested that when the fiskeler was deposited, a sudden change in the local sea level occurred.

It underlies the Cerithium Limestone Member which is Danian in age and contains Paleocene ammonites.

== Paleontology ==
The fiskeler contains fossils of animals directly killed by the Chixculub impactor, including an abundance of scales and teeth from fish (with most being microscopic in size), with few other fossils of which include mussels and zoophytes. The first chondrichthyan fossils (including thirty-one distinct species and one indeterminate specimen) from the fiskeler were described by Adolfssen & Ward (2014). This suggested the fauna was similar to Maastrichtian Germany and Danian Sweden, linking the fiskeler to the Tethys Ocean.

Only one three-dimensional fish specimen has been found within the fiskeler, and it was described by Forchammer (1849). It is missing the tail and head, and it probably belonged to Berycidae.
