= Edda oil and gas field =

Oil field in Norway

The Edda oil and gas field was a crude oil and associated gas production field in the Norwegian sector of the central North Sea. Production of oil and gas started in 1979, peak oil and gas was achieved in 1980. Production ceased in 1998 and the installation and field infrastructure were dismantled in 2012.

== The field ==
The characteristics of the Edda field reservoir are as follows.

Edda field properties
Field	Edda
Reservoir	Maastrichtian and lower Paleocene chalk. Upper Cretaceous Tor formation
Block	2/7a
Reservoir depth	3100 m, 10,500 feet
API gravity	33-39°
Gas Oil ratio (GOR)	1,125 scf/bbl (standard cubic feet / barrel)
Sulphur content	0.1%
Pressure	7,175 psi (49,470 kPa)
Discovery	September 1972
Recoverable reserves	44-68 million barrels oil; 220-600 billion cubic feet gas

== Owner and operator ==
The field was owned and operated by ConocoPhillips Skandinavia AS.

== Infrastructure ==
The field was developed through a single offshore installation, designated Edda ‘C’.

Edda infrastructure
Name	Edda ‘C’
Coordinates	56.464839°N 3.104464°E
Water depth	71m
Bridge	To flare structure
Installation	May 1978
Function	Production and accommodation
Production start	1979
Type	Steel jacket
Substructure weight tonnes	6,155
Topsides weight tonnes	10,390
Number of wells	13 (15 slots)
Legs	12
Piles	12
Flare	3-leg jacket
Status	Decommissioned
Export, liquids	10-inch 8-mile pipeline to Ekofisk R
Export, gas	12-inch 8-mile pipeline to Ekofisk R
Design contractor	Brown and Root
Jacket fabrication	NAPM Vlissingen
Deck fabrication	RDL Methil
Accommodation	48

== Production ==
The design production capacity was 4,100 Nm^{3}/day oil and 1 million Nm^{3}/day gas. Initial separation was at 515 psia (35.5 bar). Process facilities included gas dehydration and oily water treatment.

Production from the Edda field was by natural depletion. From 1988 gas from Tommeliten Gamma was used as gas lift for the Edda wells. The oil, NGL (natural gas liquids)and gas production profile of the Edda field is as shown.

Edda production profile
Year	Oil (million standard m^{3} oil equivalent	NGL (MSm^{3}OE)	Gas (MSm^{3}OE)
1979	0.049088	0.002244	0.010064
1980	1.260264	0.084601	0.420312
1981	0.717792	0.071256	0.408622
1982	0.423624	0.055091	0.296568
1983	0.291055	0.044767	0.200605
1984	0.231917	0.029223	0.133306
1985	0.19199	0.022817	0.089882
1986	0.139436	0.01308	0.051593
1987	0.049961	0.00408	0.014713
1988	0.079292	0.006468	0.018187
1989	0.170931	0.014284	0.044442
1990	0.178578	0.015096	0.049031
1991	0.144094	0.009506	0.037357
1992	0.168869	0.009709	0.042032
1993	0.136341	0.007884	0.032994
1994	0.136903	0.007414	0.031291
1995	0.145824	0.007139	0.031132
1996	0.138113	0.006296	0.031357
1997	0.103684	0.005044	0.020162
1998	0.059554	0.003026	0.012671

Over this period, Edda produced 30.3 million barrels of oil, 1.97 million scm of gas and 21 000 tonnes of NGL.

Edda ‘C’ ceased in production in 1998 and the installation was removed from the field in 2012.

== See also ==
- Ekofisk oil field
- Albuskjell oil and gas field
- Cod oil gas and condensate field
- Eldfisk oil and gas field
- Odin gas field
- Embla oil and gas field
- Tor oil field
