= Rødvig Formation =

Geological formation in Denmark

- Stratigraphic range: Danian; ~65–62 Ma
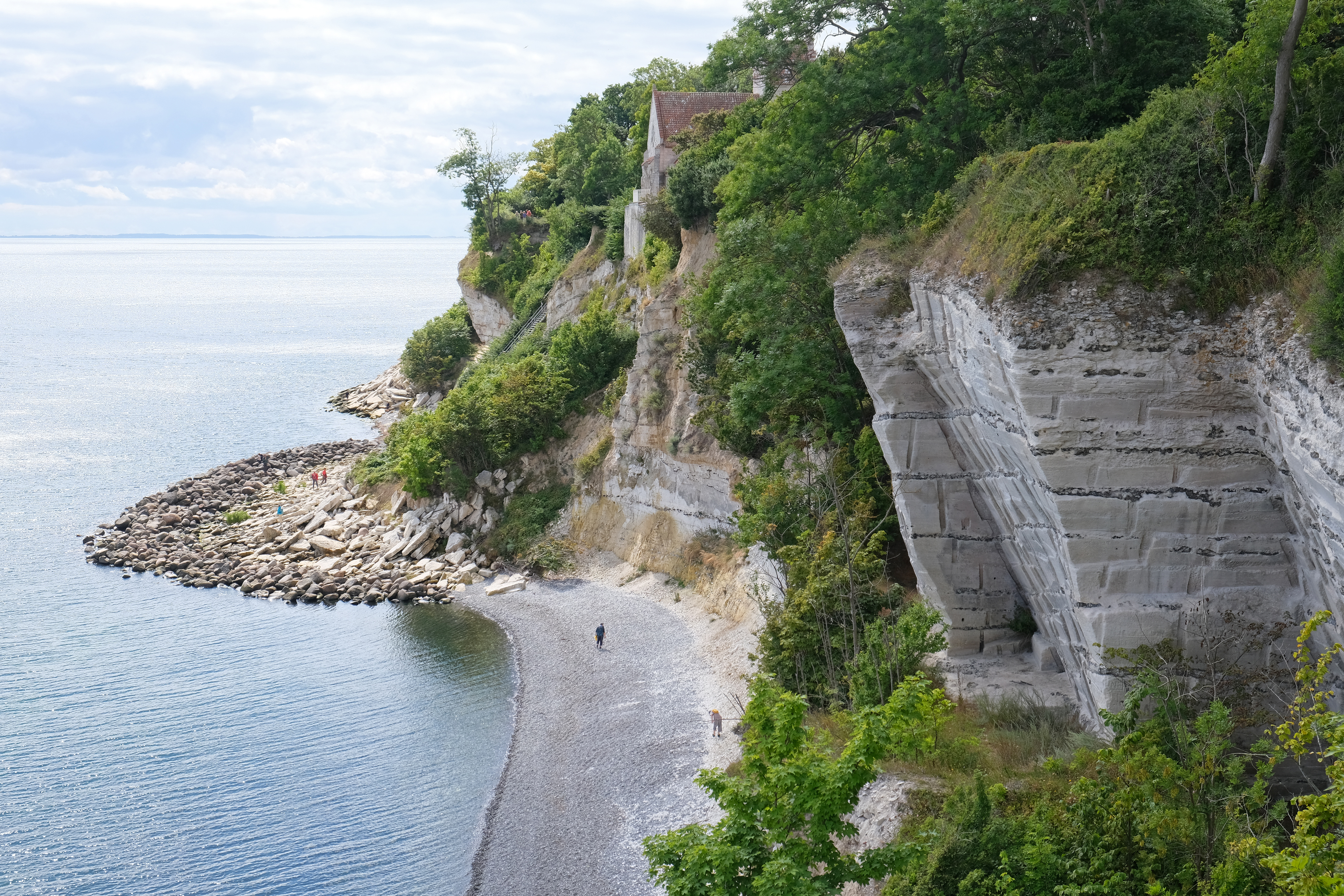
- Stevns Klint, where the Rødvig Formation outcrops
- Type: Geological formation
- Unit of: Chalk Group/Danienkalk
- Sub-units: Fiskeler Member, Cerithium Limestone Member
- Underlies: Stevns Klint Formation
- Overlies: Tor Formation
- Thickness: 10 centimetres (3.9 in) to 30 centimetres (12 in)

Lithology
- Primary: Bryozoa chalk and dark clay
- Other: Limestone and marl

Location
- Region: Zealand
- Country: Denmark
- Extent: Stevns Klint

Type section
- Named by: Richard Taylor and Richard Phillips
- Year defined: 1827

The Rødvig Formation is a geological formation deposited during the earliest part of the Danian (early Paleocene; c. 65-62 Ma) and it was first identified by Richard Taylor and Richard Phillips in 1827. It is known from exposures at Stevns Klint in Denmark. The unit lies directly above the K–Pg boundary and contains fossils that provide a record of the recovery of various groups following the Cretaceous–Paleogene extinction. The upper boundary of the formation is an unconformity in the form of a hardground, beneath which the formation is sometimes missing. The base of the unit is irregular due to the presence of mounding associated with bryozoa, causing variations in thickness. The unit is subdivided into the lower Fiskeler Member mainly formed of marl and the overlying Cerithium Limestone Member.

== Geology ==
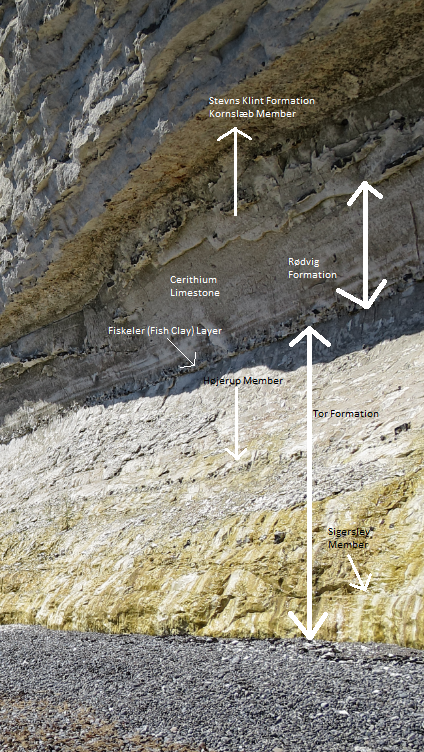
The three fossil formations of Stevns Klint, with the Rødvig Formation in the middle

The dark layer of fiskeler, (Note: A Danish word that is traditionally used by geologists as a label for this layer, parallel to its English translation "Fish Clay". It was given this name by the Danish geologist Johan Georg Forchhammer in 1825, as it contained scales and teeth from fish, but few other fossils.) mainly five to ten centimeters thick, clearly marks the Cretaceous–Paleogene boundary and overlies the Maastrichtian age Tor Formation. The fiskeler is enriched in iridium, a fact used as an argument for the Alvarez hypothesis that the worldwide Cretaceous–Paleogene mass extinction was caused by the impact of an asteroid. Following the boundary is a layer of darker clay and chalk between 10 and 30 cm thick, corresponding to a period of low biological diversity on the sea floor immediately after the K-Pg Boundary.

== Paleontology ==
The Rødvig Formation contains a remarkably detailed and complete fossil record of the biota in Northern Europe during the early Paleogene. The layers are rich in microfossils, containing many species of millimeter-long suspension feeders. A wide variety of benthic foraminifera species have been identified from the Rødvig Formation, with significant differences in abundance across the K–Pg boundary demonstrating the biotic turnover that occurred during the mass extinction event.

=== Ammonites ===
The Rødvig Formation was the first known site to document the short-term survival of ammonites into the Paleogene, when they were originally thought to have gone extinct at the K-Pg boundary. Ammonites are thus only known from the first 200,000 years of the Cerithium Limestone, before disappearing from the formation around 64.8 million years ago.

Two ammonite species are known from the Rødvig Formation: Baculites vertebralis, notable for having a nearly straight shell, and Hoploscaphites constrictus, which may have been a subspecies of Scaphites, and is also the most common ammonite known from the Paleocene.

== Known fossil fauna ==
The known fossil fauna found in the Rødvig Formation includes:

- Acar sp.
- Arcida indet.
- Arcopsis christinae
- Arcopsis sp.
- Baculites vertebralis
- Barbatia sp.
- Bathyarca sp.
- Bivalvia indet.
- Brachidontes sp.
- Carcharias aff. gracilis
- Centroscymnus praecursor
- Chlamydoselachus sp.
- Cuspidaria (Halonympha) kanae
- Corbulamella sp.
- Crassatella sp.
- Crassescyliorhinus germanicus
- Cretalamna sp.
- Cuspidaria sp.
- Cyclaster danicus
- Cyrtodaria sp.
- Dacrydium sp.
- Echinorhinus sp.
- Eriphylopsis sp.
- Euciroa sp.
- Hemiscyllium hermani
- Heterodontus rugosus
- Hoploscaphites constrictus
- Gregariella sp.
- Leptosolen sp.
- Limopsis ravni
- Limopsis sp.
- Loripes sp.
- Lucinidae indet.
- Martesia sp.
- Miocardiopsis sp.
- Myrtea sp.
- Nebrius sp.
- Nielonella sp.
- Palaeocypraea spirata
- Palaeogaleus cf. faujasi
- Palaeohypotodus aff. bronni
- Parasquatina cappettai
- Paratriakis curtirostris
- Portlandia arctica
- Protocardia sp.
- Pycnodonte vesicularis (=Phygraea vesiculare)
- “Scyliorhinus” biddlei
- “Scyliorhinus” elongatus
- Spondylus fimbriatus
- Squalus gabrielsoni
- Syncylonema nilsoni
- Synechodus faxensis (=Paleospinax)
- Thalassinoides sp.
- Thyasira sp.
- Tylocidaris oedumi
- Uddenia sp.
- Unicordium sp,
- Vetericardiella sp.
- Yoldiella sp.
