= Type locality (geology) =

Area defining a rock type or formation

A type locality in geology is the specific geographic locality where a particular rock type, stratigraphic unit, unstratified rock unit, mineral species, stratigraphic boundary, or other geological feature was originally defined and named. The type area is the geographic area or region that surrounds the type locality (stratotype, if defined) of a stratigraphic unit or stratigraphic boundary.

The concept is similar to type site in archaeology.

== Rock types ==
Whether a rock type has a type locality varies between sedimentary, metamorphic, and igneous rocks. Sedimentary rocks, which are characteristically classified by properties such as grain size, mineralogy, and kind, typically lack type localities. Although not one sole classification system is used for the description of metamorphic rocks, either their mineral composition and visual structure or composition and the nature of the protolith are typically the main criteria for naming metamorphic rocks. Thus, like sedimentary rocks, metamorphic rocks also typically lack type localities.

Depending on the etymology of the specific name for an igneous rock, it may or may not have a type locality. Before petrology was a formal science, local, descriptive terms that lack a formal type locality were used. For example, basalt was first named in 1546 by Agricola from Burg Stolpen in Germany, using the term basaltes, a misspelling of basanites, meaning "very hard stone". In another case, the word granite, which is as old as 1640, was derived either from French granit or Italian granito, meaning simply "granulate rock". During the 1800s as new science of petrography incorporated the use of petrographic microscopes and chemical analysis, the practice by geologists was to name rocks after a place where it occurred—the type locality. For example, dunite is named for the for Dun Mountain in New Zealand and charnockite is named after the rock that forms the tombstone of Job Charnock, the founder of Calcutta (now Kolkata), India. In some cases, igneous rock types are named after locations some distance away from their type localities, such as trondhjemite named for Trondheim in Norway, although the type locality is at Støren, 50 km (31 mi) to the south. This practice led to the rapid proliferation of different names for very similar rocks; over 1,500 distinct names for igneous rocks; and great confusion. The creation of the IUGS Subcommission on the Systematics of Igneous Rocks and their classification system based on either modal mineral proportions of select mineral groups or total alkalis versus silica reduced the over 1,500 rock names to about 297 rock names.

== Stratigraphic units ==
In the case of layered sedimentary and volcanic deposits or a boundary between the layers within them, a type locality is the specific geographic locality at which the designated stratotype of the stratigraphic unit or the boundary is located. In the case of older stratigraphic units and boundaries, which lack a designated stratotype, the type locality is the locality where the unit or boundary was originally defined or named. A type locality differs from a stratotype in that it is a specific geographic locality rather than the specific profile or stratigraphic section that has been measured, described, and designated as the stratotype. In the selection of a type location and stratotype, accessibility and stability, both current and future, should be considered in its selection.

Although many formations have type localities that are at outcrop, an increasing number of formations are only defined from borehole information, particularly where the extent of the formation is entirely offshore. The Ekofisk Formation has, for instance, a type section in hydrocarbon exploration well 2/4-5 in the Norwegian sector of the North Sea (Ekofisk oil field), with reference sections in three other wells.

Unlayered rock units, such as igneous intrusions and metamorphic rocks where the degree of deformation and/or metamorphism is sufficient to remove original rock textures such that the law of superposition cannot be applied, are difficult to incorporate into a standard stratigraphic framework. However, these units, sometimes referred to as lithodemic, are beginning to be included and, therefore, require a type locality or area for their formal definition. In northern England, the Whin Sill intrusion has a designated type area; "High Force and High Force Quarry, Teesdale, Co. Durham".

== Minerals ==
In mineralogy, a type locality is the specific geographical location where a mineral was first discovered and described in detail in the scientific literature. Since 1959, the concept of a type locality has been fundamental in mineralogical research because it is a reference point for future studies of that mineral. The specimens of a mineral from its type locality, known as a type mineral, are the standard by which a mineral can be compared against specimens of other minerals.

In some cases the mineral species may be named for the type locality, such as strontianite, named for the type locality at Strontian in Scotland. Some locations are, however, type localities for multiple mineral species; for example, Tolbachik volcanic field on the Kamchatka Peninsula is the type locality for 153 mineral species.

== Other geological features ==
Type localities are also used in other parts of the Earth Sciences, although they are not a formal requirement. Mount Monadnock, for example is regarded as the type locality for the landform monadnock. Some faults have assigned type localities, such as the Glencoul and Arnaboll thrusts, both parts of the Moine Thrust Zone.
