= Odin gas field =

Gas field in the North Sea

Coordinates: 60.1674°N 2.2416°E

The Odin gas field was a gas producing field in the Norwegian sector of the central North Sea. Production of gas started in October 1984, the peak gas production of 360 mmcfd (million cubic feet per day) was achieved in 1985. Production ceased in 1994 and the field installation was dismantled in 1997.

== The field ==
The characteristics of the Odin field reservoir were as follows.

Odin reservoir
| Field | Odin |
| Block | 30/10a |
| Reservoir | Eocene |
| Reservoir depth | 2,000 metres |
| Porosity | 29 % |
| Permeability | 600 millidarcy |
| Pressure & Temperature | 2,995 psia, 142°F |
| Composition | CH_{4} 94%, C_{2}H_{6} 4%, C_{3}H_{8} 1%, CO_{2}+N_{2} 1% |
| Discovery | March 1974 |
| Recoverable reserves | 0.8 trillion cubic feet gas |

== Owners and operator ==
The field was owned and operated by Esso Exploration and Production Norway Inc. (100%).

== Infrastructure ==
The Odin field was developed through a single offshore installation.

Odin installation
| Name | Odin |
| Coordinates | 60°04’37.31”N 02°09’56.83”E |
| Block | 30/10a |
| Water depth, metres | 103 |
| Bridge | To Treasure Hunter semi-submersible during drilling phase |
| Installed | July 1983 |
| Function | Drilling, production, accommodation |
| Production start | October 1984 |
| Type | Fixed steel |
| Substructure weight, tonnes | 7,300 |
| Topsides weight, tonnes | 9,400 |
| Well slots | 12 |
| Number of wells | 9 production |
| Legs | 4 (2.4m diameter) |
| Piles | 16 (1.8m diameter) |
| Current status | Dismantled |
| Gas export | 26 km, 20-inch pipeline to Frigg TCP2 |
| Design contractor | McDermot Norge |
| Jacket fabrication | Dragados Cadiz |
| Deck fabrication | Aker Stord Verft, Nymo Mek Verksted, Mannesmann Nederland |
| Accommodation | 48, plus 140 on Treasure Hunter |

== Production ==
The design production capacity of Odin was 10.2 million standard cubic metres per day of gas.

The gas production profile of the Odin field was as shown.

Odin production profile
| Year | Gas (MSm^{3}OE) |
|---|---|
| 1984 | 1.515276 |
| 1985 | 3.549164 |
| 1986 | 3.370983 |
| 1987 | 3.475083 |
| 1988 | 2.728852 |
| 1989 | 2.827152 |
| 1990 | 2.625087 |
| 1991 | 2.810438 |
| 1992 | 2.288614 |
| 1993 | 1.503364 |
| 1994 | 0.565082 |

Odin ceased production in 1994 and the installation was removed from the field in 1997.

The field may be redeveloped if the Yggdrasil area development is approved.

== See also ==
- Frigg gas field
- Ekofisk oil field
- Edda oil and gas field
- Cod oil gas and condensate field
- Albuskjell oil and gas field
- Eldfisk oil and gas field
- Embla oil and gas field
- Tor oil field
