= Albuskjell oil and gas field =

Oil field located in Norway

The Albuskjell oil and gas field was a crude oil and associated gas production field in the Norwegian sector of the central North Sea. Production of oil and gas started in 1979, peak oil and gas was achieved in 1982. Production ceased in 1998 and the field installations were dismantled by 2013.

== The field ==
The characteristics of the Albuskjell field reservoir are as follows.

Field	Albuskjell
Reservoir	Gas and condensate: Maastrichtian and lower Paleocene chalk. Main reservoir: Upper Cretaceous Tor formation
Block	1/6
Reservoir depth	3,200 m, 10,600 feet
API gravity	48°
Gas Oil ratio (GOR)	13,043 scf/bbl (standard cubic feet / barrel)
Sulphur content	0.5%
Pressure	7,266 psi (50,097 kPa)
Discovery	August 1972
Recoverable reserves	172 million barrels oil; 2.4 billion cubic feet gas

== Owners and operator ==
The field was owned and operated by ConocoPhillips Skandinavia AS.

== Infrastructure ==
The Akbuskjell field was developed through two offshore installations:

Name	Albuskjell 'A'	Albuskjell 'F'
Coordinates	56.462886°N 2.940008°E	56.602536°N 3.053947°E
Block	1/6	2/4
Water depth	71m	71 m
Bridge	To flare structure	To flare structure
Installation	September 1976	March 1977
Function	Drilling, production and accommodation	Drilling, production and accommodation
Production start	May 1979	July 1979
Type	Steel jacket	Steel jacket
Substructure weight tonnes	8,902	7,190
Topsides weight tonnes	10,649	11,418
Number of wells	15 (20 slots)	10 (20 slots)
Legs	12	12
Piles	12	12
Flare	3-leg jacket and intermediate support	3-leg jacket and intermediate support
Status	Decommissioned	Decommissioned
Export, liquids	18-inch 5.28-mile pipeline to Albuskjell F	18-inch 8.125-mile pipeline to Ekofisk R
Export, gas	24-inch 2.28-mile pipeline to Albuskjell F	18-inch 8.125-mile pipeline to Ekofisk R
Design contractor	Tecnomare	Tecnomare
Jacket fabrication	Aker Trondelag at Verdal	NAPM a Vlissingen
Deck fabrication	Aker Stord at Stord	Aker Stord at Stord
Accommodation	46 originally, 96 replacement in 1983	46 originally, 96 replacement in 1983

== Production ==
The design production capacity of Albuskjell 'A' was 79,400 bopd (barrels of oil per day) and 274 mmscfd (million standard cubic feet per day) of gas. Initial separation was at 1,280 psia (88.3 bar).

The production capacity of Albuskjell 'F' was almost identical, 79,400 bopd and 273 mmscfd. Process facilities included gas dehydration and oily water treatment. Peak production was 80,000 bopd and 450 mmscfd in 1982.

Production from the Albuskjell field was by natural depletion. The oil, natural gas liquids (NGL) and gas production profile of the Albuskjell field is as shown.

Albuskjell production profile
Year	Oil (million standard m^{3} oil equivalent	NGL (MSm^{3}OE)	Gas (MSm^{3}OE)
1979	0.531158	0.060289	0.651959
1980	1.441672	0.207705	1.779093
1981	1.42621	0.268375	2.248558
1982	0.95293	0.250901	1.998169
1983	0.697342	0.253451	1.654546
1984	0.461588	0.169006	1.18348
1985	0.357291	0.156644	1.026213
1986	0.28525	0.129324	0.945511
1987	0.215786	0.106315	0.778243
1988	0.175572	0.095923	0.613004
1989	0.1415	0.067016	0.456129
1990	0.10894	0.045838	0.338582
1991	0.090845	0.031397	0.271183
1992	0.086781	0.026808	0.266091
1993	0.096074	0.032594	0.308713
1994	0.081022	0.027668	0.263826
1995	0.073878	0.02448	0.236197
1996	0.054346	0.021044	0.217567
1997	0.046137	0.020038	0.191699
1998	0.029543	0.011605	0.10563

Albuskjell ceased in production in 1998 and the installations were removed from the field in 2011 and 2013. Significant reserves remain in place and may be exploited in future.

== See also ==
- Ekofisk
- Edda oil and gas field
- Cod oil gas and condensate field
- Eldfisk oil and gas field
- Odin gas field
- Embla oil and gas field
- Tor oil field
