= William Phillips (geologist) =

English mineralogist and geologist (1775–1828)

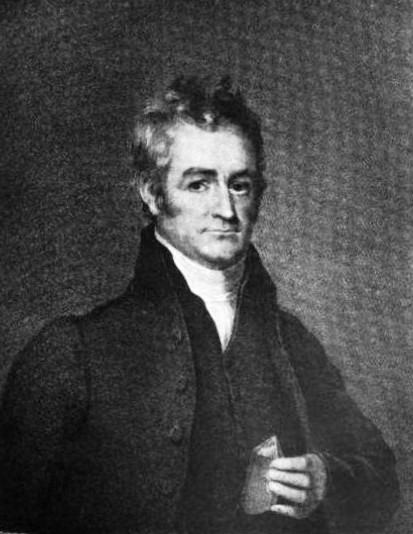
William Phillips

William Phillips FGS FRS (10 May 1775 – 2 April 1828) was an English mineralogist and geologist.

== Biography ==
Phillips was the son of James Phillips, printer and bookseller in London. He became interested in mineralogy and geology and was one of the founders of the Geological Society of London (1807). The foundation of the Geological society came about through a series of business meetings, some held in Phillips' house in London, by a group of mineral enthusiasts who wished to finance the publication of a treatise on mineralogy by Louis de Bournon; Phillips was to be the publisher. His Outlines of Mineralogy and Geology (1815) and Elementary Introduction to the Knowledge of Mineralogy (1816) became standard textbooks.

His digest of English geology, A selection of Facts from the Best Authorities, arranged so as to form an Outline of the Geology of England and Wales (1818), formed the foundation of the larger work undertaken by Phillips in conjunction with William Conybeare, of which only the first part was published, entitled Outlines of the Geology of England and Wales (1822). This book had a major influence on the development of geology in Britain. In this work Phillips reprinted his description of the chalk cliffs of Dover and other parts of East Kent. Phillips was a member of the Religious Society of Friends. He was elected a Fellow of the Royal Society in 1827.

In 1796 he and his brother Richard, together with William Allen and Luke Howard, took part in forming the Askesian Society. The zeolite mineral phillipsite is named for him.
