= Embla oil and gas field =

Norwegian gas field in the North Sea

The Embla oil and gas field is a high-pressure high-temperature (HPHT) crude oil and associated gas producing field in the Norwegian sector of the central North Sea. Production of oil and gas started in 1993, peak oil and gas was achieved in 1994, and the field is still operational.

== The field ==
The characteristics of the Embla field reservoir are as follows.

Embla field reservoir
Field	Embla
Reservoir	Devonian and Permian segmented sandstone and conglomerate
Block	2/7-D
Reservoir depth, metres	4,000
Properties	High-pressure high-temperature (160°C)
Discovered	1988
Original recoverable reserves	19.5 million Sm^{3} oil equivalent
Now in reserve	0.8 million Sm^{3} oil equivalent (2023)

== Owners and operator ==
The current (2024) owners of the Embla field and their respective stakes are:

Company	Interest
TotalEnergies EP Norge AS	39.896
ConocoPhillips Skandinavia AS	35.112
Vår Energi ASA	12.388
Sval Energi AS	7.604
Petoro AS	5

The field is operated by ConocoPhillips Skandinavia AS.

== Infrastructure ==
The field has been developed with an unmanned wellhead platform facility, which is remotely controlled from Eldfisk.

Parameter	Value
Block	2/7
Latitude	56.333231°N
Longitude	3.248264°E
Water depth, metres	70
Type	Fixed steel
Sunstructure, tonnes	3,927
Topsides, tonnes	2,465
Legs	4
Export	5.2 km, 14-inch pipeline to the Eldfisk S facility

== Production ==
Production started in May 1993. The production profile is as follows:

Year	Oil (million standard m^{3} oil equivalent	NGL (MSm^{3}OE)	Gas (MSm^{3}OE)
1993	0.68811	0.045611	0.210479
1994	1.415889	0.096269	0.428067
1995	1.272605	0.08568	0.389236
1996	0.998578	0.071814	0.355248
1997	0.736073	0.061547	0.296414
1998	0.484881	0.039422	0.185904
1999	0.700903	0.062354	0.251046
2000	0.636833	0.061203	0.225318
2001	0.495126	0.043202	0.082133
2002	0.387038	0.035957	0.079229
2003	0.403208	0.033641	0.108767
2004	0.400365	0.040014	0.15875
2005	0.281662	0.029661	0.135441
2006	0.32992	0.038658	0.158861
2007	0.196946	0.025141	0.110466
2008	0.218954	0.031435	0.144456
2009	0.224458	0.031504	0.145303
2010	0.172151	0.031901	0.155435
2011	0.147996	0.022678	0.11728
2012	0.12046	0.018494	0.091611
2013	0.12518	0.01419	0.068675
2014	0.192006	0.017747	0.075517
2015	0.129199	0.016723	0.083684
2016	0.154376	0.020026	0.102055
2017	0.184917	0.021756	0.109142
2018	0.146766	0.022029	0.105742
2019	0.08709	0.020663	0.102822
2020	0.076664	0.024585	0.0945
2021	0.067407	0.020813	0.092841
2022	0.070596	0.02762	0.118317
2023	0.172317	0.045169	0.209868

== See also ==
- Eldfisk oil and gas field
- Ekofisk oil field
- Edda oil and gas field
- Cod oil gas and condensate field
- Albuskjell oil and gas field
- Odin gas field
- Tor oil field
