= Edward Maltby =

British bishop (1770–1859)

The Right Reverend Edward Maltby
- Bishop of Durham
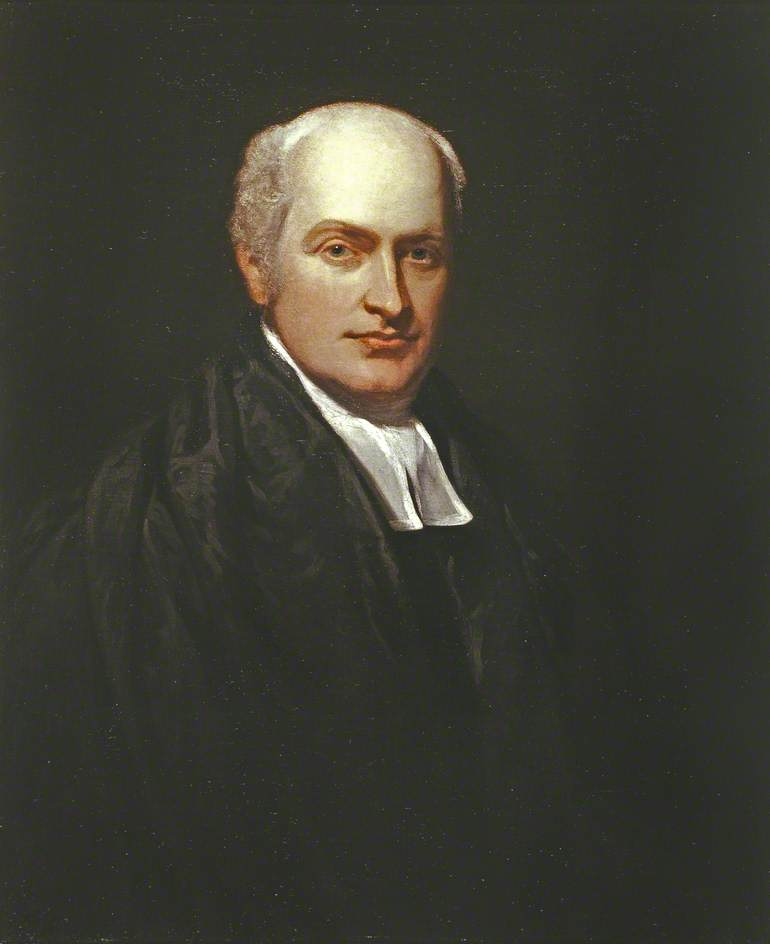
- Diocese: Diocese of Durham
- In office: March 1836 (translated)–1856 (retired)
- Predecessor: William Van Mildert
- Successor: Charles Longley
- Other posts: a senator, London University (1826–?); Bishop of Chichester (28 September 1831 {conf.}–1836)

Personal details
- Born: 6 April 1770 Norwich, Norfolk, England
- Died: 3 July 1859 (aged 89) Marylebone, Middlesex, England
- Buried: 11 July 1859, Kensal Green Cemetery
- Denomination: Anglican
- Residence: 1 Upper Portland Place (at death)
- Parents: George & Mary née Fearman
- Spouse: 1. Mary Harvey, 1794 (m.)–1825 (her d.); 2. Margaret Green, 1826 (m.)–1859 (his d.)
- Children: 4 sons (with Harvey), incl. Fred. W. & Hen. J.
- Education: Norwich Grammar School; Winchester College
- Alma mater: Pembroke College, Cambridge

Ordination history of Edward Maltby
History
Diaconal ordination
- Ordained by: George Pretyman (Lincoln)
- Date: 26 May 1793
- Place: Buckden Towers
Priestly ordination
- Ordained by: Pretyman (Lincoln)
- Date: 6 April 1794
- Place: St Paul's Cathedral
Episcopal consecration
- Consecrated by: William Howley (Canterbury)
- Date: 2 October 1831

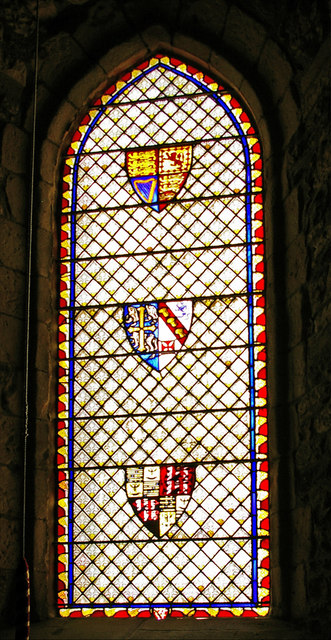
Centre: arms of Edward Maltby as Bishop of Durham: See of Durham impaling Maltby (Argent, on a bend gules between a lion rampant (azure) and a cross pattée of the second three garbs or); Church of St Mary the Virgin, Holy Island, (Lindisfarne), Northumberland

Edward Maltby (6 April 1770 – 3 July 1859) was an English clergyman of the Church of England. He became Bishop of Durham, controversial for his liberal politics, for his ecumenism, and for the great personal wealth that he amassed.

== Early life ==
Maltby was born in Norwich. He was the fourth son of George (died 1794), a weaver and deacon at the Presbyterian Octagon Chapel, and Mary (died 1804), his wife. William Maltby was a cousin. Though presbyterian by persuasion, the family were not hostile to the Anglican Church. Maltby attended Norwich Grammar School, where he became close to headteacher Samuel Parr but when Parr retired in 1785, he transferred to Winchester College under Joseph Warton. William Enfield also reputedly played a part in his education.

In 1784, Maltby's cousin Elizabeth had married George Pretyman and Pretyman sponsored Maltby's entry into Pembroke College, Cambridge in 1789. Maltby was a distinguished scholar and, finding his nonconformist inclinations no barrier, he graduated as eighth wrangler in 1792, receiving his DD in 1806. In 1794, Maltby had become domestic chaplain to Pretyman. Maltby consequently received a Lincoln prebend and two vicarages: Buckden, Huntingdonshire and Holbeach, Lincolnshire. On 10 July he married Mary Harvey. The couple were to go on to have four sons. With Pretyman's patronage and a well-received book of apologetics, Maltby was strongly favoured for eventual elevation to a bishop.

== Wilderness years ==
However, Maltby meddled in politics prematurely. His involvement in the 1807 general election in Huntingdonshire and an 1809 pamphlet criticising what he saw as the nepotism of prime minister William Cavendish-Bentinck, 3rd Duke of Portland saw to it that he found no favour with the Tory establishment who were to hold power until 1830. However, Parr interceded with George Canning and Maltby became preacher at Gray's Inn in 1817 and Lincoln's Inn between 1824 and 1835. Maltby took the opportunity of light clerical duties to tutor private pupils, including:

- Edward Bouverie Pusey;
- Edward Hall Alderson; and
- Charles James Blomfield, for no fee, so impressed was Maltby;

He also found time to write including publication of a collection of hymns (1815) and a projected, but uncompleted, edition of the New Testament.

Mary died in 1825 and he married Margaret Green in 1826. Maltby was active in the Society for the Diffusion of Useful Knowledge and he was a senator of the newly formed London University (now University College London), blessing the foundation stone of the Main Building in 1827.

== Bishop ==
When the Whigs returned to power in 1830, prime minister Charles Grey, 2nd Earl Grey lacked a comfortable majority in the House of Lords and saw Maltby as a probable supporter if he could be appointed to the Lords Spiritual. Conveniently for Grey, Folliott Cornewall, Bishop of Worcester, died in September 1831. Grey transferred Robert Carr, then Bishop of Chichester, to Worcester and then appointed Maltby to Chichester. Grey made the appointment with such undue haste that Maltby's congé d'élire arrived in Chichester before Cornewall's funeral and the public was scandalised. However, Grey was satisfied when Maltby was able to vote in favour of the Reform Bill.

In 1837, Maltby became Bishop of Durham, the first after the abolition of the office of Prince-Bishop. In 1847, John Russell, 1st Earl Russell, a close personal friend, canvassed him as Archbishop of York but Maltby felt the role too much for his years.

== Doctrinal controversy ==
On his appointment, Maltby was the sole Whig among the Lords Spiritual, save for 87-year-old Henry Bathurst, Bishop of Norwich, and he attracted much personal hostility and criticism. However, Maltby was driven by his conscience and an over-riding ecumenism and even-handedness in his associations and criticism. His public controversies and scandals included:

- Dining in public, both with Unitarians and with Roman Catholics (1834);
- Presenting the Sovereign's Orb at Queen Victoria's coronation at the wrong moment. The Queen called him "remarkably maladroit" (1838);
- Subscribing to a book of sermons by Unitarian William Turner. Maltby was denounced and burnt in effigy (1838);
- Criticism of the Tractarians for their attitudes towards episcopacy (1840 onwards);
- Reminded to Evangelicals that they held no monopoly on the truth (1845); and
- Following the reestablishment of the Roman Catholic Hierarchy in England, by the papal bull Universalis Ecclesiae, Maltby denounced the move in a letter to Russell, inspiring Russell's "Durham letter" (1850).

== Durham University ==
Maltby had strong connections to the University of Durham, making generous financial provision. He also assisted in the negotiations of its royal charter, persuading the government to honour its undertaking to his predecessor, William Van Mildert, that all students must subscribe to the Thirty-Nine Articles before graduation. Van Mildert had arranged for the bishop's residence to be moved to Auckland Castle in 1832 in order for the University to occupy Durham Castle as University College, Durham in 1837; by that time, Maltby had arranged to make the necessary renovations.

== Wealth and personal life ==
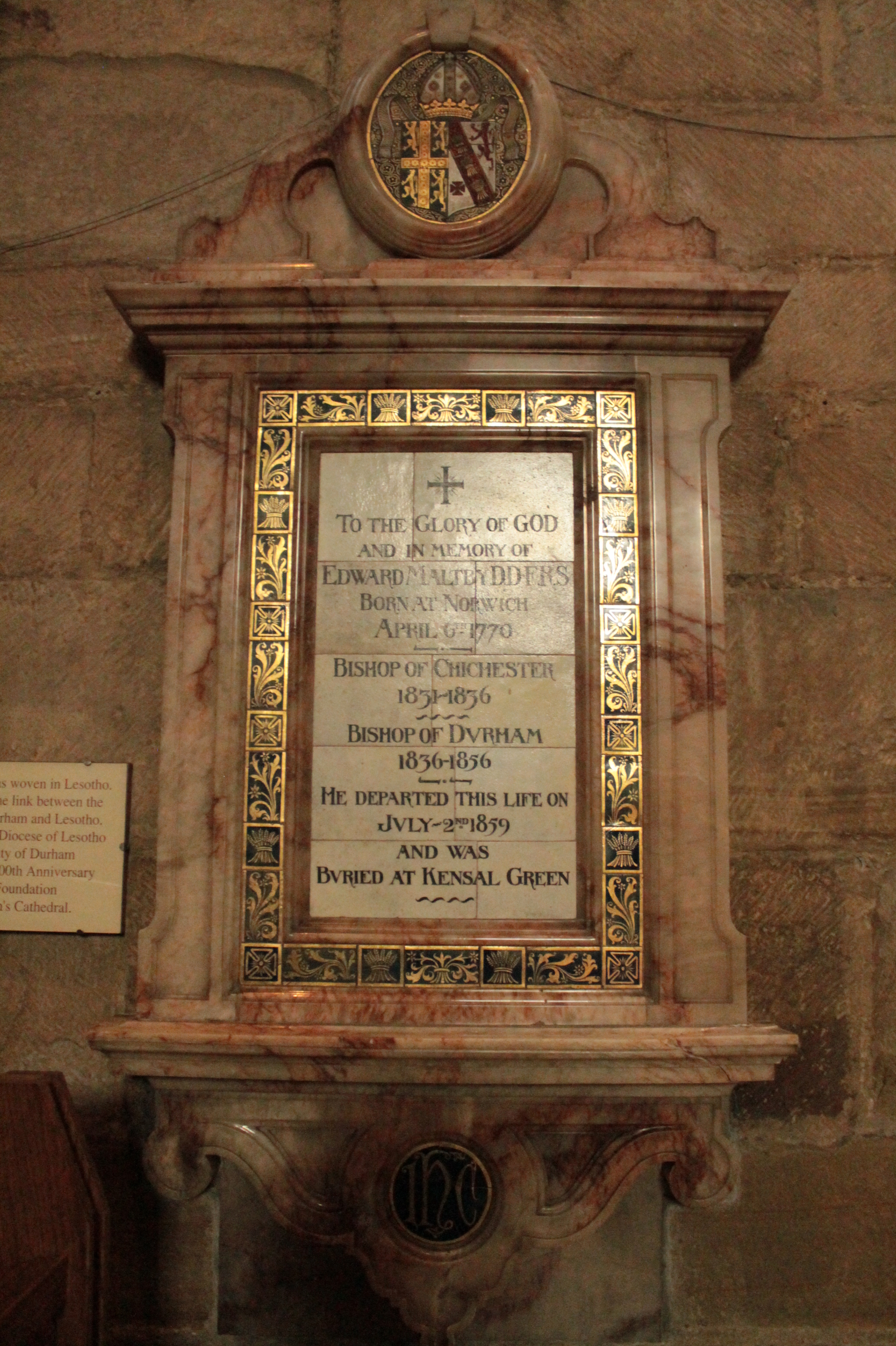
Memorial to Bishop Edward Maltby, Durham Cathedral

The Established Church Act 1836 set the maximum annual income for a bishop at £8,000 (£525,000 at 2003 prices) but it was revealed in 1847 that Maltby was earning around £12,000 (£787,000), having exceeded £21,000 (£1.4 million) in 1841. In response to the widespread public criticism, he established the Maltby Fund for building work in the Durham diocese.

He caused further scandal in 1855 when, elderly and almost blind, Maltby made an unprecedented request that he be allowed to retire and suggested an annual pension of £4,500 (£307,000).This was eventually conceded despite criticisms of simony, allowing Blomfield, now Bishop of London, to retire at the same time.

Maltby died at his London residence and is buried in Kensal Green Cemetery in London, sharing a family vault with his eldest brother. A tablet to his memory was erected in Durham Cathedral.

== Honours ==
- Fellow of the Royal Society, (1824);
- Fellow of the Society of Antiquaries (1834);

== Bibliography ==
- Obituaries:
  - The Times, 7 July 1859
  - Durham Chronicle, 8 July 1859

- Fowler, H. C. (1990) "Edward Maltby: his episcopal superintendence and views as bishop of Durham’, MA diss., University of Durham
- Maltby, E. (1802). Illustrations of the Truth of the Christian Religion. Printed by J. Burges [etc., etc.]
- — (1815). Lexicon Graeco-prosodiacum.
- Varley, E. A. (2004) "Maltby, Edward (1770–1859)", Oxford Dictionary of National Biography, Oxford University Press. Retrieved 11 August 2007 (subscription, Wikipedia Library access or UK public library membership required)
- Welch, P. J. (1964). "The two episcopal resignations of 1856". Church Quarterly Review. 165: 17–27.

Church of England titles
Preceded by Robert Carr	Bishop of Chichester; 1831–1836	Succeeded by William Otter
Preceded by William Van Mildert	Bishop of Durham; 1836–1856	Succeeded by Charles Longley
Professional and academic associations
Preceded by Walter Montagu Douglas Scott, 5th Duke of Buccleuch	President of the Surtees Society; 1837–40	Succeeded by Richard Griffin, 3rd Baron Braybrooke
