= William Maltby =

English bibliographer and librarian

William Maltby (1763–1854) was an English solicitor, librarian and bibliographer, known also as a close friend of the poet Samuel Rogers.

== Early life ==
Born in London on 17 January 1763, he was youngest of the ten children of Brough Maltby, a wholesale draper, of Mansion House Street, and his wife Ann Dyer; Edward Maltby the bishop was a first cousin, as was the journalist John Dyer Collier, father of John Payne Collier. He was educated at the school of the Rev. James Pickbourne in Hackney, where he formed his life-long acquaintance with Samuel Rogers, a fellow-pupil.

== Legal career ==
Maltby went on to study at Gonville and Caius College, Cambridge, but as a Dissenter, did not take a degree. He practised law as a solicitor for at time with his elder brother, Rowland Maltby, who had been clerk to the Fishmongers' Company. On 23 June 1787 he was called to the bar at Gray's Inn.

Rowland Maltby was a witness in 1809 for the parliamentary investigation into the affair of Mary Anne Clarke, supposed as a royal mistress to have sold army commissions. On 13 February he revealed the involvement of Russell Manners, a former Member of Parliament: he and Manners had married sisters.

== Librarian ==
After the death of Richard Porson in 1808, William Maltby succeeded him as principal librarian of the London Institution on 1 February 1809; its library had been founded in 1806, and Maltby had William Upcott as assistant. He started a programme of expansion, and by 1811 there were 12,000 books. He twice moved the books within London—in 1811 from Sir Robert Clayton's house in the Old Jewry to King's Arms Yard, Coleman Street, and in 1818 to 11 Finsbury Circus.

In 1834 Maltby was superannuated from active duty, when Upcott was asked to resign, but kept the use of his apartments. In 1841 he was left money in trust by Louisa Maltby, Rowland's widow.

Maltby died at the London Institution on 5 January 1854, and was buried at Norwood cemetery, where a tablet was erected to his memory by his old friend Rogers.

== Works ==
Maltby took part in the compilation of the 1813 and 1835 London Institution library catalogues. He also contributed to Recollections of the Table Talk of Samuel Rogers (1866), by Alexander Dyce, an appendix Porsoniana.
