= Eldfisk oil and gas field =

Oil and gas field in the North Sea

The Eldfisk oil and gas field is a crude oil and gas producing field in the Norwegian sector of the central North Sea. Production of oil and gas started in 1979 and peak oil and gas production was achieved in 1980. The facilities have been extended and are still operational.

== The field ==
The characteristics of the Eldfisk field reservoir are as follows.

Eldfisk field reservoir
Field	Eldfisk
Reservoir	Upper Cretaceous to Danian Chalk
Block	2/7a
Reservoir depth	9,500 feet, 600 feet pay
API gravity	33°
Gas Oil ratio (GOR)	1,525 scf/bbl (standard cubic feet / barrel)
Sulphur content	0.2%
Pressure	6,815 psi (46,988 kPa)
Discovered	December 1970
Recoverable reserves	502 million barrels oil; 107 to 3.0 billion cubic feet gas

== Owners and operator ==
Currently (2024), the owners of the Eldfisk field and their respective stakes are:

Company	Interest
TotalEnergies EP Norge AS	39.896 %
ConocoPhillips Skandinavia AS	35.112 %
Vår Energi ASA	12.388 %
Sval Energi AS	7.604 %
Petoro AS	5 %

The field is operated by ConocoPhillips Skandinavia AS.

== Infrastructure ==
The Eldfisk field was originally developed through the use of three offshore platforms.

Eldfisk original platforms
Name	Eldfisk ‘A’	Eldfisk ‘FTP’	Eldfisk ‘B’
Coordinates	56.376881°N 3.265803°E	56.265933°N 3.265803°E	56.419331°N 3.218394°E
Block	2/7	2/7	2/7
Water depth, metres	71	71	71.5
Bridge	To ‘FTP’	To ‘A’ and to flare structure	None
Installed	July 1975	unknown	May 1976
Function	Drilling, production and accommodation; now well	Separation, dehydration, compression	Drilling, production and accommodation
Production start	August 1979	August 1979	December 1979
Type	Steel jacket	Steel jacket	Steel jacket
Jacket weight, tonnes	4,206	2,689	4,353
Total weight, tonnes	13,410	10,615	15,513
Number of wells	30 (30 slots)	None	19 (20 slots)
Legs	12	8	12
Piles	12	8	12
Status	Operational	Operational	Operational
Export, liquids	Bridge to FTP	24-inch 3.5-mile pipeline to Eldfisk ‘B’	24-inch 11-mile pipeline to Ekofisk R
Export, gas	Bridge to FTP	30-inch 3.5-mile pipeline to Eldfisk ‘B’	30-inch 11-mile pipeline to Ekofisk R
Design contractor	Brown and Root, Worley Engineering	Brown and Root, Worley Engineering	Brown and Root
Jacket fabrication	NAPM, Vlissingen	UIE, St Wandrille	NAPM, Vlissingen
Deck fabrication	Weldit	Dragados Spain	Weldit
Accommodation	72, replacement 112	None	96

=== Field development ===
A water injection facility Eldfisk E was installed in the field in 1999. This facility also supplies water to Ekofisk K. A new integrated facility, Eldfisk S, started operation in 2015. This is connected by bridge to Eldfisk E. This facility replaces several functions of Eldfisk A and Eldfisk FTP. Eldfisk A has been converted into a wellhead platform and Eldfisk FTP is used as bridge-support facility. The Embla oil and gas field, located south of Eldfisk, is tied back to Eldfisk S.

Eldfisk development platforms
Name	Eldfisk ‘E’	Eldfisk ‘S’
Coordinates	56.375086°N 3.265207°E	54.37374°N 3.262698°E
Block	2/7	2/7
Water depth, metres	72	72
Type	Fixed steel	Fixed steel
Installed	September 2000	May 2013
Jacket weight, tonnes	3,215	13,000
Topsides weight, tonnes	6,857	15,900
Bridge	Eldfisk FTP	Eldfisk E
Function	Water injection	Production

== Production ==
The original production capabilities were as follows.

Parameter	Eldfisk ‘A’	Eldfisk ‘FTP’	Eldfisk ‘B’
Production throughput	11,300 Nm^{3}/d oil		75,500 bopd
Production throughput	3.2 mm Nm^{3}/d gas		83 mmscfd
Peak field production	250,000 bopd		
Peak field production	545 mmcfgd		
Separation pressure			515 psia
Processing		Separation, gas dehydration and compression	Separation, gas dehydration and compression

Eldfisk production profile is as follows.

Eldfisk production 1979 to 2023
Year	Oil (million standard m^{3} oil equivalent	NGL (MSm^{3}OE)	Gas (MSm^{3}OE)
1979	1.712171	0.07268	0.412552
1980	5.875162	0.295319	1.495868
1981	4.933234	0.28094	1.511063
1982	4.114687	0.278639	1.385161
1983	3.714956	0.328743	1.439742
1984	3.380447	0.295573	1.389068
1985	3.37752	0.33031	1.393686
1986	3.357574	0.305772	1.443272
1987	3.144948	0.294376	1.35857
1988	3.82161	0.510611	2.246695
1989	4.205455	0.558868	1.56655
1990	3.68102	0.481153	1.309914
1991	2.980452	0.328683	1.982256
1992	2.784801	0.271134	1.841552
1993	2.450877	0.250734	1.711507
1994	2.229795	0.22939	1.548579
1995	2.692235	0.291626	1.995236
1996	2.334067	0.242935	1.670471
1997	2.353065	0.259537	1.703038
1998	1.517407	0.168756	1.067927
1999	1.164147	0.100657	0.556743
2000	1.272862	0.117158	0.6638
2001	1.99595	0.145434	0.74928
2002	2.392482	0.163374	0.926202
2003	2.41857	0.141576	0.742094
2004	3.163272	0.184533	0.884927
2005	3.510821	0.177832	0.860075
2006	3.012221	0.15245	0.693708
2007	2.644137	0.121008	0.53389
2008	3.022456	0.13646	0.56242
2009	2.858015	0.117331	0.484842
2010	2.873997	0.114753	0.50499
2011	2.89384	0.108093	0.475727
2012	2.644953	0.089178	0.283571
2013	1.92996	0.06943	0.256955
2014	1.954917	0.069333	0.275454
2015	2.380954	0.08552	0.340688
2016	2.457843	0.082901	0.324835
2017	2.532525	0.084259	0.340787
2018	2.429397	0.077286	0.276703
2019	2.325186	0.074895	0.244598
2020	2.484702	0.111038	0.247082
2021	2.612156	0.117412	0.302349
2022	2.301337	0.090945	0.222865
2023	2.23726	0.083059	0.20453

== See also ==
- Ekofisk
- Edda oil and gas field
- Cod oil gas and condensate field
- Albuskjell oil and gas field
- Odin gas field
- Embla oil and gas field
- Tor oil field
