= Cod oil gas and condensate field =

Oil field in Norway

The Cod oil gas and condensate field was a gas and associated natural gas liquids (NGL) production field in the Norwegian sector of the central North Sea. Production of oil and gas started in 1977, peak gas and NGL was achieved in 1980. Production ceased in 1998 and the field installation was dismantled in 2013.

== The field ==
The characteristics of the Cod field reservoir were as follows.

Properties of Cod reservoir
Field	Cod
Block	7/11a
Reservoir	Paleocene sand
Reservoir depth	9,700 feet
API gravity	49°
Oil Gas ratio (OGR)	70 barrels per million standard cubic feet at 210 °F
Pressure	5,565 psi
Discovery	June 1968
Recoverable reserves	20 million barrels oil condensate; 250 billion cubic feet gas

== Owner and operator ==
The field was owned and operated by ConocoPhillips Skandinavia AS.

== Infrastructure ==
The Cod field was developed through an offshore installation.

Cod installation
Name	Cod
Coordinates	57.069553°N 2.434722°E
Block	7/11
Water depth, metres	72.5
Bridge	To flare tower
Installed	May 1975
Function	Drilling, production, accommodation
Production start	December 1977
Type	Fixed steel
Substructure weight, tonnes	5,094
Topsides weight, tonnes	5,167
Number of wells	9
Legs	8
Piles	8
Flare	Tripod tower bridge link
Status	Dismantled
Export, liquids and gas	46.9 mile, 16-inch, 2-phase pipeline to Ekofisk
Design contractor	Kvaerner
Jacket fabrication	UIE St. Wandrille
Deck fabrication	UIE St. Wandrille
Accommodation	52

== Production ==
The design production capacity of Cod was 17,400 bopd (barrels of oil per day) and 117 mmscfd (million standard cubic feet per day) of gas. Initial separation was at 500 psia (88.3 bar). There was a single 3-phase separator with provision for 350 bpd of produce water. The produced gas was dried in a glycol contactor. Condensate was dried in coalescing filters. Dehydrated oil and gas streams were combined and sent to Ekofisk in a single 2-phase pipeline.

Cod also received gas from the Ulla field which passed directly to the export pipeline.

Production from the Cod field was by natural depletion. The oil, natural gas liquids (NGL) and gas production profile of the Cod field is as shown.

=== Cod production profile ===
Year	Oil (million standard m^{3} oil equivalent	NGL (MSm^{3}OE)	Gas (MSm^{3}OE)
1977	0.001563	0	0.004224
1978	0.067707	0	0.13767
1979	0.285336	0.034961	0.481982
1980	0.465008	0.106834	0.843338
1981	0.342374	0.088603	0.69129
1982	0.3224	0.104771	0.757831
1983	0.283257	0.125424	0.730345
1984	0.19131	0.086764	0.528718
1985	0.153451	0.083159	0.454683
1986	0.125805	0.068082	0.404842
1987	0.081413	0.048838	0.280762
1988	0.100118	0.067628	0.353651
1989	0.070958	0.046021	0.255183
1990	0.057171	0.034896	0.194441
1991	0.051321	0.025296	0.172983
1992	0.048911	0.022525	0.171408
1993	0.045536	0.021368	0.157185
1994	0.046297	0.021127	0.155257
1995	0.0469	0.022374	0.163722
1996	0.041718	0.019423	0.14773
1997	0.032772	0.016849	0.117144
1998	0.017806	0.011088	0.074871

Cod ceased production in 1998 and the installation was removed from the field in 2013.###nor

== See also ==
- Ekofisk oil field
- Edda oil and gas field
- Albuskjell oil and gas field
- Eldfisk oil and gas field
- Odin gas field
- Embla oil and gas field
- Tor oil field
