= William Haseldine Pepys =

English scientist (1775–1856)

William Haseldine Pepys FGS FRS (23 March 1775 – 17 August 1856) (or William Hasledine Pepys—both versions were used during his lifetime) was an English scientist and founder of learned institutions who contributed significantly to the advancement of the chemical and physical sciences during the first half of the 19th century.

== Biography ==
Pepys was born in London, the son of William Pepys and his wife Laetitia Weedon. He was descended from Richard Pepys MP cousin of the diarist. His father was a cutler and maker of surgical instruments and Pepys was apprenticed to his father as a cutler on 16 April 1789. He was released on 10 May 1796 and became a liveryman of the Worshipful Company of Cutlers of London in 1796. He also became part of a group of London-based Quakers and dissenters who were excluded from the political and social mainstream because of their religion, and being occupied in skilled proprietarial enterprises "fostered zealous commitment to the progress of utility, wealth, knowledge and talent".

In 1796 he was one of the founders of the Askesian Society, and on 2 April 1799 at a meeting held at his laboratory at 2 Plough Court he was part of a group including William Allen that founded the British Mineralogical Society. The membership of the BMS was made up of middle-class chemists, physicians, and owners of businesses such as iron-making and instrument manufacturers which were increasingly subject to technological change. The BMS was a forerunner of the Geological Society of London.

In his own research, Pepys worked on soda-water apparatus in 1798 and also researched into using mercury contacts for electrical apparatus and tubes coated in India rubber to convey gases, inventing the mercury gasometer as a result. In the field of experimental physics, he investigated several aspects of the recently discovered Voltaic electricity: his 'Voltaic coil', consisting of only two plates, but of very large dimensions, was particularly suited for investigating electromagnetic phenomena and was so used in his friend Humphry Davy's researches.

His father died in 1805 and Pepys extended his father's business into making instruments for the philosophical discipline. Pepys own application of electrolysis, linked to his business, was shown in his attempts to melt platinum by the discharge from his very large batteries. In 1805 Pepys made some fruit knives in platinum, presenting one to Sir Joseph Banks and asking him to present a pair to George III.

In 1806 Pepys was prominent in the founding of the London Institution and was an original manager. In 1807 he invented a type of eudiometer, and in 1808 he was elected to the Royal Society, of which he was a Fellow by 1815. In 1808 and 1809 he was involved in the subscription to the 'great battery' installed at the Royal Institution. By 1815, Pepys used an electric current to heat iron in the presence of diamond to produce steel. This removed any remaining doubts that diamond was a form of carbon.

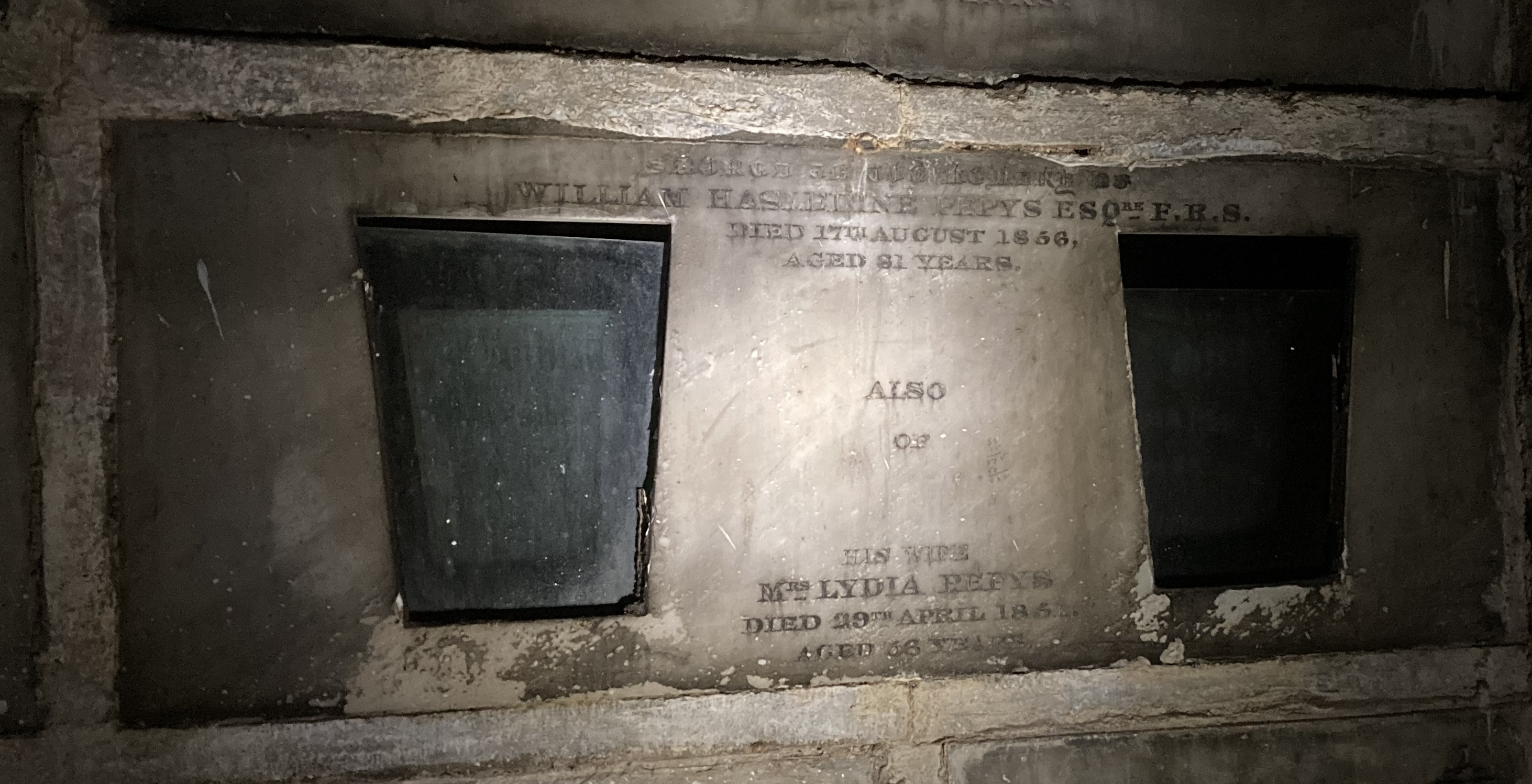
Graves of William Hasledine Pepys and his wife Lydia in the Terrace Catacombs, Highgate Cemetery

Another close friend was William Allen and together they investigated the composition of carbon dioxide, and the density of ammonia, and elucidated the chemical phenomena of respiration in man, animals, and plants. These researches were successful largely because of the ingenious apparatus invented and designed by Pepys. He was active in the management of the Royal Institution of Great Britain and was its vice-president in 1816. He was honorary secretary of the London Institution from 1821 to 1824 and was Master of the Worshipful Company of Cutlers in 1822 and 1828. He became the Treasurer and Vice-President of the Geological Society.

As well as the manufacture of surgical instruments in the City he took active directorships in the Imperial Continental Gas Association, which was introducing gas illumination to cities and towns across Europe, and the General Steam Navigation Company, which first used steam-propelled vessels to maintain a regular passenger and cargo service to Continental ports.

Pepys married Lydia Walton in 1815 and they had several children. He died at his home at Earl's Terrace, Kensington and is buried to the left of his wife Lydia in the Terrace Catacombs, Highgate Cemetery.

== Publications ==
- Description of a new Gas Holder Philosophical Magazine 13 1802
- A New Eudiometer accompanied with experiments elucidating its application Philosophical Transactions 97 (1807)
- On the quantity of carbon in carbonic acid: and the nature of the diamond Philosophical Transactions (1807) with William Allen
- On the changes produced in atmospheric air and oxygen gas by respiration Philosophical Transactions (1808) with William Allen
- On respiration (1809) Philosophical Transactions with William Allen
- Notice respecting the decomposition of sulphate of iron by animal matter. (1811)
- Description of a new Construction of the voltaic Apparatus (1817)
