= William Upcott =

English librarian and antiquary (1779–1845)

- Born: 1779; Oxfordshire, England
- Died: September 23, 1845 (aged 66); Islington, London
- Occupations: Librarian, antiquary, collector
- Employer: London Institution
- Known for: Founding the Guildhall Library
- Notable work: Bibliographical Account of the Principal Works relating to English Topography (1818)
- Father: Ozias Humphry

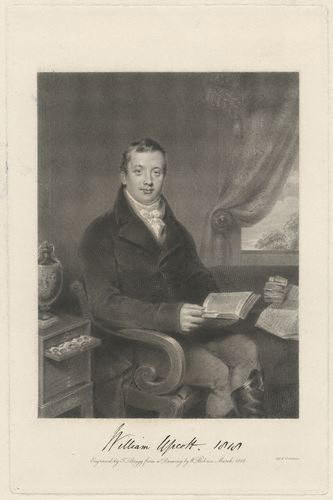
William Upcott, engraving from 1818 by T. Bragg from a portrait by William Behnes

William Upcott (1779–1845) was an English librarian and antiquary.

== Life ==
Born in Oxfordshire, he was the illegitimate son of Ozias Humphry by Delly Wickens, daughter of an Oxford shopkeeper, called Upcott from the maiden name of Humphry's mother. His father bequeathed to him his miniatures, pictures, drawings, and engravings, as well as correspondence with many leading figures.

Upcott was initially a bookseller, at first an assistant of Robert Harding Evans of Pall Mall, and then of John Wright of Piccadilly. While at Wright's shop he attracted the attention of John Ireland, William Gifford, and the writers of the Anti-Jacobin who met there, and he witnessed the scuffle there between Gifford and John Wolcot, helping to eject Wolcot.

When Richard Porson was made librarian of the London Institution, Upcott was appointed as his assistant (23 April 1806), and he continued in the same position under William Maltby. On 30 May 1834 he resigned his office.

Upcott spent the rest of his days at 102 Upper Street, Islington. The house in his time was called "Autograph Cottage"; among many autographs collected by Upcott was that of William Blake, in 1826, with whom he was on good terms, as his father had been, and made some significant introductions to Blake (Henry Crabb Robinson and Dawson Turner). In imitation of the plan adopted by William Oldys, he fitted up a room with shelves and a hundred receptacles into which he dropped cuttings on different subjects. The Guildhall Library originated in a suggestion by him, and in 1828 he superintended the arrangement of the books in it.

Upcott died, unmarried, at Islington on 23 September 1845.

== Collector ==
The walls in Upcott's rooms, whether at the London Institution or at his home in Islington, were covered with paintings, drawings, and prints, most of them by Thomas Gainsborough or Humphry; all the drawers, shelves, boxes, and cupboards were crammed with his collections. In 1833, while still at the London Institution, he was robbed of the whole of his collection of gold and silver coins and some other curiosities; £500 was voted to him.

Upcott's library, books, manuscripts, prints, and drawings were sold by Sotheby at Evans's auction-rooms, 106 New Bond Street (15 June 1846 and following days), and are said to have realised £4,125 17s. 6d. He owned about 32,000 letters, illustrated by three thousand portraits, many of which were engraved in Charles John Smith's Historical and Literary Curiosities. Many of the autograph letters were bought for the nation, and became Add MSS 15841-15957 at the British Museum. They are now part of the British Library collections. The sketch-books of Ozias Humphry (Add MSS 15958–15969) were purchased by Thomas Rodd at the sale, but were at once resold to the British Museum.

The main parts of Upcott's collections which were not acquired by the British Museum consisted of the correspondence of Ralph Thoresby (which was edited by Joseph Hunter) and of Emanuel da Costa. A large series of autograph letters from Upcott's stores was purchased by Captain Montagu Montagu, R.N., and left by him at his death in 1863 to the Bodleian Library. Many of Humphry's works passed at Upcott's death to his friend, Charles Hampden Turner.

In 1836 Upcott privately printed a brief catalogue of his letters, manuscripts, and state papers, in the hope that they might be bought for some public institution. One of his major finds was the original manuscript of Thomas Chatterton's extravaganza Amphitryon, which he chanced upon in the shop of a city cheesemonger. It was purchased by the British Museum in 1841.

== Works ==
Upcott published in 1818, in three volumes, a Bibliographical Account of the Principal Works relating to English Topography. It was later largely superseded by the British Topography (1881) of John P. Anderson, who refers in his preface to Upcott's "excellent catalogue". Upcott revised for the press the first edition of John Evelyn's Diary, brought out by William Bray in 1818, and for the edition of 1827 he collated the copy with the original manuscript at Wotton and made corrections. In 1825 he further edited Evelyn's Miscellaneous Writings. He reprinted in 1814 Andrew Borde's Boke of the Introduction of Knowledge, and in 1819 Edmund Carter's History of the County of Cambridge.

Robert Southey was indebted to Upcott for the transcript of Thomas Malory's King Arthur (1817), and Upcott corrected it for the press. He took an active part in the publication of the Garrick Correspondence, and in the preparation of the Catalogue of the London Institution; and assisted in compiling the Biographical Dictionary of 1816.

== Notes ==
Attribution

This article incorporates text from a publication now in the public domain: Lee, Sidney, ed. (1899). "Upcott, William". Dictionary of National Biography. Vol. 58. London: Smith, Elder & Co.
