= London Institution =

Former British educational institution

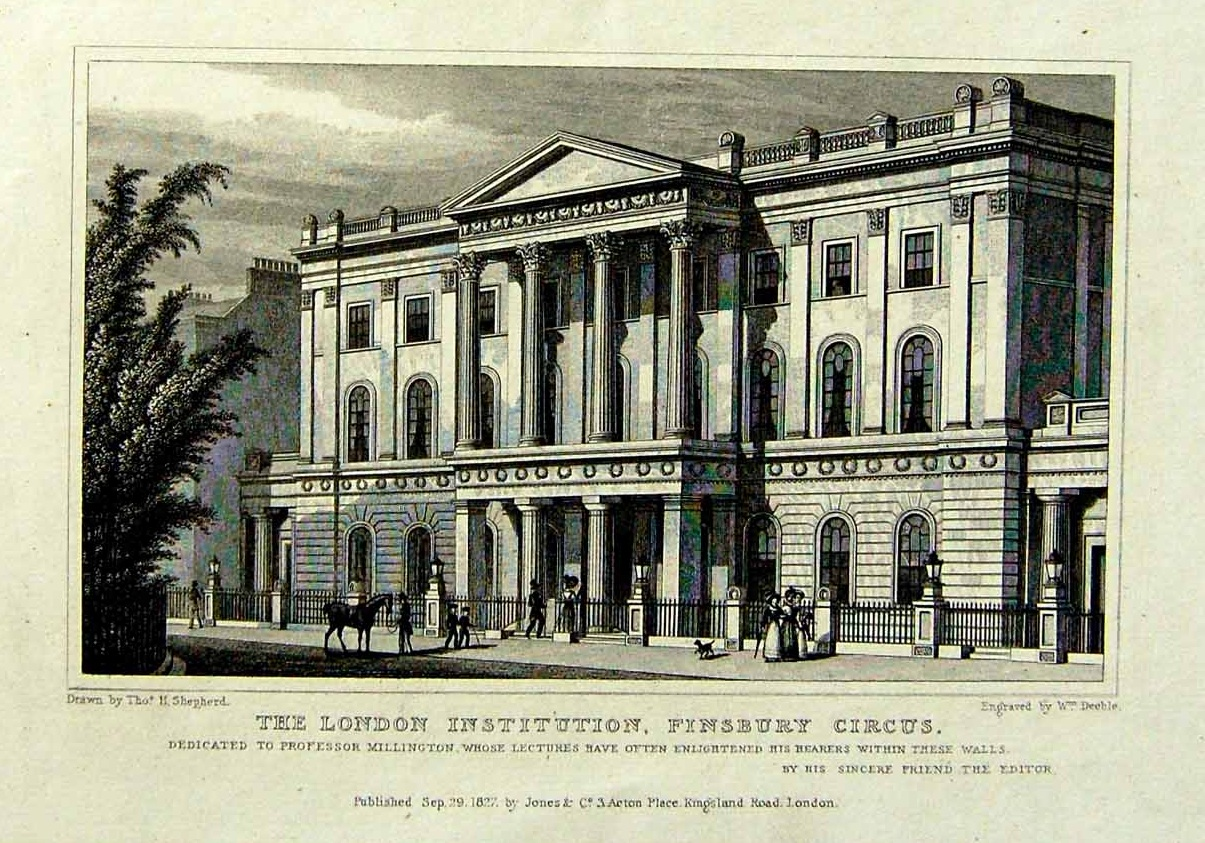
London Institution, etching by William Deeble

The London Institution was an educational institution founded in London in 1806 (not to be confused with the British Institution for Promoting the Fine Arts in the United Kingdom founded the previous year, with which it shared some founders). It preceded the University of London in making scientific education widely available in the capital to people such as the Dissenters who adhered to non-orthodox religious beliefs and were consequently barred from attending Oxford University or Cambridge University.

The Institution moved into premises at Finsbury Circus in 1815 and was particularly noted for the teaching of chemistry. It closed in 1912 and the buildings were used for the University of London until their demolition in 1936.

== Foundation ==
The first recorded meeting to discuss the idea of an Institution was arranged by Sam Woods on 27 March 1805, and held at Mr Bodley's house in Lombard Street A further meeting was held the following month at the George & Vulture Tavern in George Yard, Lombard Street, when Sir Francis Baring took the chair and at this meeting it was agreed to send an introductory letter signed by William Haseldine Pepys to a number of potential patrons, mostly London bankers and merchants. A more formal meeting took place at 12 noon on 23 May 1805, at the London Tavern, again chaired by Sir Francis Baring, to discuss the practical details that would be involved in setting up a proper "London Institution". The philosophical aim of the London Institution was "to promote the diffusion of Science, Literature and the Arts", and the objects were to provide

(i) – A Library to contain Works of Intrinsic Value
(ii) – Lectures for the Diffusion of Useful Knowledge
(iii) – Reading Rooms for the Daily Papers, Periodical Publications, interesting Pamphlets, and Foreign Journals.

The Institution was to consist of a limited number of Proprietors and Life and Annual Subscribers. It was agreed that the motto of the Institution would be Studio fallente laborem and that its purpose would be to procure "the advancement of literature and the diffusion of useful knowledge".

The Institution was established on 18 January 1806, in the house of Sir William Clayton (Lord Mayor of London in the time of Charles II), at 8 Old Jewry in the City of London at an annual rent of £350. It was modelled on the Royal Institution in London's West End. By 21 January 1807, a royal charter for the "London Institution for the Promotion of Literature and Useful Knowledge" had been drafted listing the following officers,

President

- Sir Francis Baring Bt, Banker and founder of Barings

Vice-presidents

- Sir Richard Neave, 1st Baronet, West Indies merchant and Governor of the Bank of England
- Beeston Long, West Indies merchant and Governor of the Bank of England
- George Hibbert West Indies merchant, botanist and book collector
- John Julius Angerstein, West Indies merchant and art collector

Managers

- Richard Clarke
- Matthew Raine, Headmaster of Charterhouse School
- Richard Sharp Banker, Member of Parliament and conversationalist
- John Smith MP Banker and Member of Parliament
- Henry Thornton Banker, Member of Parliament and Abolitionist

Richard Porson, poet and scholar, was unanimously chosen as the first Librarian of the London Institution at a meeting on 22 April 1806. With the position went a salary of £200 per annum, a servant and rent-free accommodation. Thomas Campbell, the Scottish poet, had come to London to be considered for the position and had been 'well received' but rejected. A man of Porson's eminence seemed a coup for the Institution and shortly afterwards the governors were able to buy the library of the Marquis of Lansdowne. However Porson turned out to be unsuited for the post because of his heavy drinking and untidy ways. As his responsibilities grew in proportion to the Institution's increasing collection of valuable books he failed to meet the challenge. Before any action needed to be taken, he died in September 1808 shortly after a fit of 'apoplexy' in the street that had led to him being anonymously committed to St Martin's Lane workhouse. William Maltby was chosen as librarian in 1809 to replace him.

Maltby carried out the duties of Librarian for the next twenty-five years. During the years 1806–11 more than £36,000 was spent on books and equipment and it was reported in the Gentleman's Magazine for 1811 that the Institution had collected ..."at a large expense, some of the rarest and most splendid specimens of Typography in the kingdom."

In his Biographical Index of the current House of Commons, J. Wilson cites Richard Sharp as an important figure in the history of this institution and claims that it was "...chiefly owing to his influences and exertions that the London Institute for the improvement of Science and Literature has been established." Many of those who supported the idea of such an educational institution for London were fellow Dissenters who were forbidden to attend Oxford or Cambridge universities because of their religious beliefs.

== Expansion ==
The Institution was short of space at Old Jewry and larger premises were needed. After considering a group of seven houses at 16–22 Token House Yard, belonging to the Bank of England, the Institution eventually moved in 1812 to a "capacious house" in King's Arm Yard, Coleman St, at a modest annual rent of only £40. This soon proved to be inadequate to cope with the Institution's rapid growth and so plans were made to move to purpose-built accommodation at Finsbury Circus. The architect of the elegant stone structure was William Brooks and the contract to build it was awarded to Thomas Cubitt, it being his first large-scale project in London.

The Institution's new building was completed in 1815 and contained a library, reading-rooms, a lecture-room capable of containing 750 people, a laboratory and other amenities. The opening was marked by a colourful procession through the streets of London conducted by the Lord Mayor. The construction of Cubitt's new building cost £31,000 and it soon housed 70,000 books by which time the Committee of Managers consisted of the following,

- John Julius Angerstein
- Francis Baring
- Sir Thomas Baring MP
- Thomas Bodley
- Richard Clarke FRS
- Harvey Combe MP
- Benjamin Harrison
- George Hibbert
- Henry Hoare
- Sir Hugh Inglis MP
- Beeston Long
- William Patrick Manning MP
- William Haseldine Pepys
- Sir Charles Price MP
- Job Raikes
- Matthew Raine DD
- John Rennie
- Richard Sharp FAS
- John Smith MP
- Sir Robert Wigram
- Sam Woods

Committee meetings were held monthly and Samuel Woods was the Institution's secretary. The popular interest being taken in all forms of scientific advance, together with the quickening pace of the industrial revolution, ensured there was a strong demand for the Institution's resources and there was no shortage of subscribers. Several hundred people paid 75 guineas for the honour of becoming a "proprietor" – the total number being limited to 1000. The cost of ordinary life membership was set at 25 guineas.

A number of strict rules were laid down: members had to apply to the Librarian or an attendant to obtain a book; no books were to be removed from the premises; and ladies could only be admitted as "subscribers to the lectures".

The Gentleman's Magazine reported

"In the winter time when the lectures are delivered by leading men of science, the theatre is as full as can well be imagined and it is by no means a quiet resting place…..but the reading room is a treat, and it is pleasant to get away from the City bustle…"

The library came to hold over 70,000 volumes and was particularly rich in topographical works, collected while William Upcott was librarian. Edward William Brayley was another long-serving librarian.

== Chemistry ==
As it developed, Chemistry became one of the main activities of the Institution in terms of the volume and variety of its presentations and the high standing of its lecturers. These included Michael Faraday, John Playfair, Norman Lockyer, and Sir William Ramsay, and many other visiting lecturers. The Institution's laboratory was limited in size and facilities, but catered for instruction in practical chemistry. Between 1863 and 1884 it gained the reputation as a significant centre of chemical research under the professorships of James Alfred Wanklyn and Henry Edward Armstrong who published frequently in chemical periodicals as 'From the Laboratory of the London Institution'. This role of the Institution declined as universities became increasingly concerned with the systematic study of chemistry.

== End ==
At the beginning of the 20th century, the location of the Institution, in Finsbury Circus was becoming increasingly inconvenient for members. In 1908, the Board of Management announced that costly repairs to the buildings were required and in 1909 the Institution came under the purview of the Royal Commission on University Education in London. The Royal Commission proposed that the building be used as a School of Oriental Studies. In 1912 the London Institution closed, the building having been transferred to H.M. Office of Works. The library of over 100,000 volumes was divided between the British Museum (now British Library), the Guildhall Library (for works of London topographic interest) and the new school. The School of Oriental Studies, as part of the University of London, opened to students in 1917, in the buildings of the London Institution. Following the move of the school to Bloomsbury, the buildings of the London Institution itself were demolished in 1936.

== See also ==
- List of demolished buildings and structures in London

The London Institution was one of four such organisations in London in the early Nineteenth century; the other three were

- The Royal Institution
- The Russell Institution
- The Surrey Institution
