= Edmund Carter (topographer) =

English surveyor, topographer and tutor

Edmund Carter (died in or before 1788) was an English surveyor, topographer and tutor, known as the author of the first county history of Cambridgeshire.

== Life ==
In earlier life, Carter was a surveyor, and worked in 1731 on a survey of an estate at Weston Longueville in Norfolk. Some years later he lived in Norwich. By 1743 he had moved to Cambridge, and ran a school near St Botolph's Church.

Carter had a wife and children, and on Cole's account was physically disabled. The family went to Ware, Hertfordshire and then Chelsea, Middlesex, where Carter was again a schoolmaster. He predeceased his wife, who died at the workhouse in Enfield on 15 September 1788.

== Works ==
Planning to write on the history of Cambridgeshire and the University of Cambridge, Carter approached the antiquarian William Cole and was rebuffed. He found local helpers, including John Newcome.

- The History of the County of Cambridge from the Earliest Account to the Present Time, Cambridge, 1753; updated by William Upcott, London, 1819. It includes a parish-by-parish account of the iconoclasm of William Dowsing of the 1640s. Carter had manuscripts of Thomas Baker to work from, through Newcome.
- The History of the University of Cambridge from its Original to the year 1753, 1753.
