= Tor oil field =

Norwegian gas field in the North Sea

The Tor oil field is a crude oil and associated gas producing field in the Norwegian sector of the central North Sea. Production of oil and gas started in 1978 and peak oil and gas was achieved in 1979. The field was shut down in 2015 and, following the completion of new wells, started up again in 2020.

== The field ==
The characteristics of the Tor field reservoir are as follows.

Tor field reservoir
Field name	Tor
Reservoir	Late Cretaceous and early Paleocene
Block	2/4 and 2/5
Reservoir depth, metres	3,200
Gas Oil Ratio, scf/bbl	1,500
API gravity	43°
Sulfur	0.1%
Pressure, psia	7,135
Discovered	November 1970
Original recoverable reserves	150-260 million bbls oil, 560-900 billion cf gas
Now in reserve (2023)	4.3 million m^{3} oe oil, 0.4 million m^{3} oe Gas, 0.3 million m^{3} oe NGL

== Owners and operator ==
The current (2024) owners of the Tor field are:

Tor field ownership
Company	Interest, %
TotalEnergies EP Norge AS	48.19879
ConocoPhillips Skandinavia AS	30.65799
Vår Energi ASA	10.81656
Sval Energi AS	6.63922
Petoro AS	3.68744

The field is operated by ConocoPhillips Skandinavia AS.

== Infrastructure ==
The field has been developed with an offshore platform facility, designated Tor E.

Tor field platform Tor E
Parameter	Value
Block	2/4
Latitude	56.642072°N
Longitude	3.326958°E
Water depth, metres	70
Type	Fixed steel
Platform design	Kvaerner Engineering
Topsides design	Worley Engineering
Function	Drilling, production, accommodation
Bridge	To flare tower
Substructure, tonnes	5,275
Topsides, tonnes	6,448
Legs	8
Piles	8
Well slots	18
Accommodation	58, in 1982 this was replaced by 96 berth accommodation
Installed in field	June 1975
Design throughput	101,600 bopd, 89 MMscfd gas
Processing	3-phase (oil/gas/water) separator operating at 500 psig, gas dehydration by glycol
Export	7.5 mile, 14-inch gas pipeline and 12-inch oil pipeline to the Ekofisk R

== Production ==
Production started in July 1978. The production profile was as follows. Units are million standard cubic metres oil equivalent.

Tor field production
Year	Oil MMSm^{3} oe	NGL MMSm^{3} oe	Gas MMSm^{3} oe
1978	1.207351	0	0.340779
1979	4.526296	0.139954	1.156825
1980	3.589572	0.277508	1.287604
1981	1.883789	0.229188	1.177126
1982	1.53073	0.272185	1.341813
1983	0.967933	0.254676	1.08709
1984	0.86721	0.217469	0.935608
1985	0.824205	0.201494	0.779392
1986	0.624547	0.116754	0.463587
1987	0.477363	0.088523	0.343058
1988	0.482864	0.095564	0.31813
1989	0.510003	0.08923	0.312373
1990	0.472642	0.068414	0.241651
1991	0.346273	0.037771	0.161191
1992	0.362346	0.031401	0.144108
1993	0.345858	0.022479	0.094797
1994	0.338599	0.019134	0.074034
1995	0.338633	0.017823	0.067366
1996	0.359242	0.01719	0.062885
1997	0.34683	0.017306	0.057085
1998	0.230711	0.010977	0.036404
1999	0.221491	0.010784	0.037131
2000	0.255572	0.010677	0.040556
2001	0.256831	0.00988	0.034708
2002	0.213535	0.00818	0.024964
2003	0.162892	0.00666	0.017144
2004	0.197161	0.008346	0.021414
2005	0.180349	0.007957	0.019744
2006	0.164293	0.008513	0.023813
2007	0.314827	0.015891	0.053809
2008	0.307169	0.012521	0.032965
2009	0.291949	0.010127	0.024138
2010	0.237053	0.007082	0.013999
2011	0.219272	0.004878	0.008242
2012	0.22339	0.005151	0.007459
2013	0.198807	0.004522	0.008314
2014	0.196979	0.004482	0.008718
2015	0.180988	0.003551	0.006555
2016	0	0	0
2017	0	0	0
2018	0	0	0
2019	0	0	0
2020	0.017476	0.000875	0.001435
2021	0.804716	0.036559	0.073409
2022	0.719511	0.035468	0.088719
2023	0.583491	0.035511	0.117698

=== Developments ===
Oil was initially produced by pressure reduction. From 1992, water flood was introduced.

Export from Tor was initially routed by two pipelines to Ekofisk R. Subsequently, in 1998, fluids were routed to Ekofisk 2/4 J.

In 1989, a gas-lift module was added, this allowed eight wells to use gas lift, compared to only three wells formerly.

In 2019, two subsea templates with eight horizontal production wells were tied back to Ekofisk centre.

The remaining recoverable reserves in 2023 were 4.3 million standard cubic meter oil equivalent oil, 0.4 million m^{3} oe Gas, 0.3 million m^{3} oe NGL.

== See also ==
- Tyne, Trent and Tors gas fields
- Tor Formation
- Ekofisk oil field
- Albuskjell oil and gas field
- Cod oil gas and condensate field
- Eldfisk oil and gas field
- Odin gas field
- Embla oil and gas field
