= Geological Society of London =

Learned society

- Formation: 13 November 1807; 218 years ago
- Founded at: Freemasons Tavern, Great Queen Street; London, WC2
- Type: Learned society
- Registration no.: 210161
- Headquarters: Burlington House, Piccadilly; London, W1
- Coordinates: 51°30′31″N 0°8′20″W
- Members: 12,000
- Website: www.geolsoc.org.uk

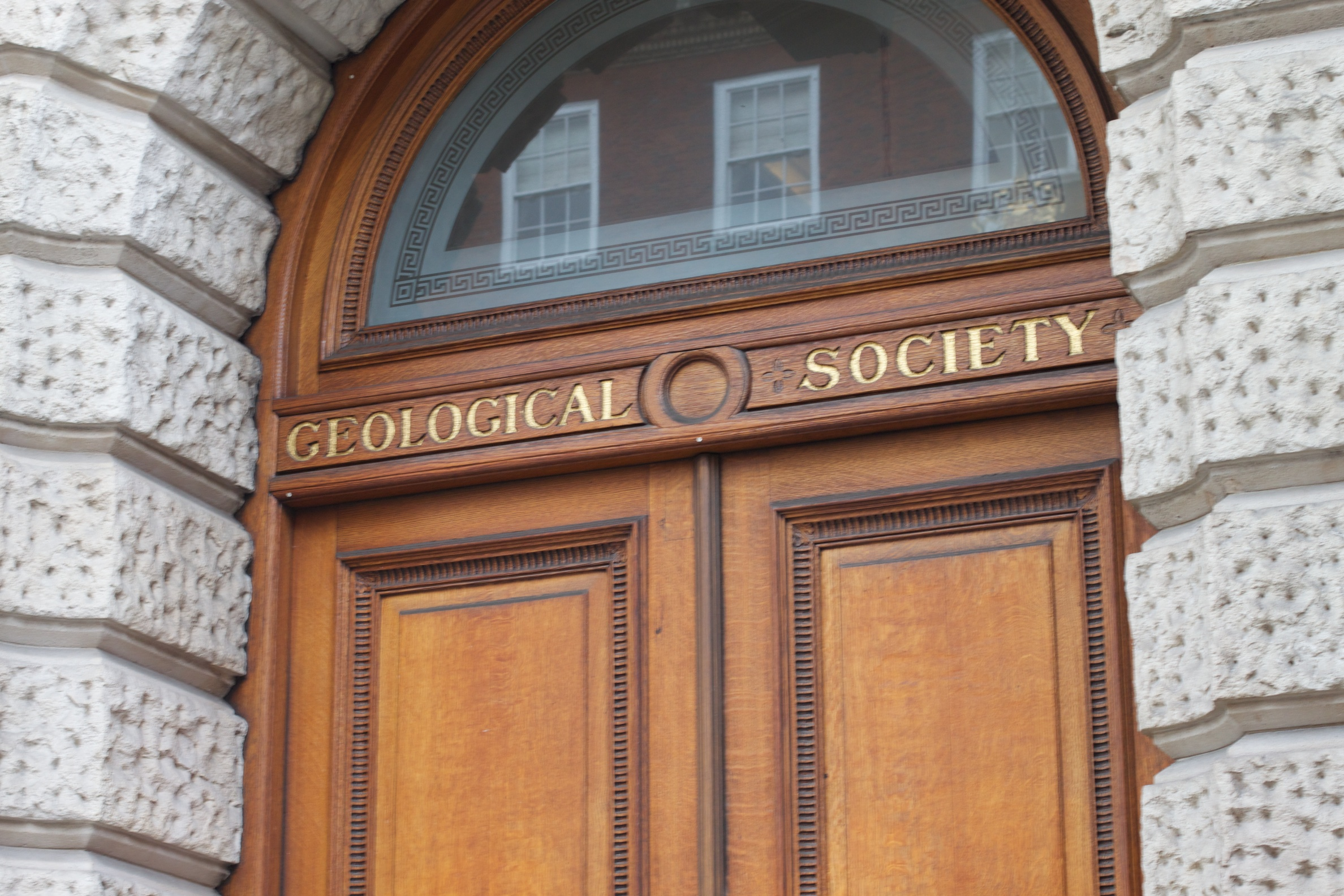
The Geological Society offices in Burlington House, Piccadilly, London

The Geological Society of London, known commonly as the Geological Society, is a learned society based in the United Kingdom. It is the oldest national geological society in the world and the largest in Europe, with more than 12,000 Fellows.

Fellows are entitled to the postnominal FGS (Fellow of the Geological Society), over 2,000 of whom are Chartered Geologists (CGeol). The Society is a registered charity, no. 210161 . It is also a member of the Science Council, and is licensed to award Chartered Scientist to qualifying members.

The mission of the society is: "Making geologists acquainted with each other, stimulating their zeal, inducing them to adopt one nomenclature, facilitating the communication of new facts and ascertaining what is known in their science and what remains to be discovered".

== History ==
The Society was founded on 13 November 1807 at the Freemasons' Tavern, Great Queen Street, in the Covent Garden district of London. It was partly the outcome of a previous club known as the Askesian Society. There were 13 founder members: William Babington, James Parkinson, Humphry Davy, George Bellas Greenough, Arthur Aikin, William Allen, Jacques Louis, Comte de Bournon, Richard Knight, James Laird, James Franck, William Haseldine Pepys, Richard Phillips, and William Phillips. It received its royal charter on 23 April 1825 from George IV.

Since 1874, the Society has been based at Burlington House, Piccadilly, London. This building houses the Society's library, which contains more than 300,000 volumes of books and journals. It is a member of the UK Science Council.

In 1907 a decision was made by the Society to admit women as Associates, under the condition they distinguished themselves as geological investigators or submitted their own original research. Women were first allowed to become Fellows of the Society in 1919. Margaret Crosfield became the first, due to alphabetical primacy, of the first eight women to be elected Fellows of the Society, on 21 May 1919.

In 1991, the Society merged with the Institution of Geologists, which had been formed in 1977 to represent the geological profession.

The Society is a member of the European Federation of Geologists.

The Society celebrated its bicentenary in 2007. It ran programmes in the geosciences in Britain and abroad, under the auspices of the science writer and palaeontologist Professor Richard Fortey, the president that year.

== Specialist and regional groups ==
The Society has 24 specialist groups and 15 regional groups which serve as an opportunity for those with specific interests to meet and discuss their subject or region. They are all free for members to join and some are open to non-members.

The Regional Groups are:

- Central Scotland
- East Anglian
- East Midlands
- Home Counties North
- Hong Kong
- North West
- Northern
- Northern Ireland
- Solent
- South East
- South West
- Southern Wales
- Thames Valley
- West Midlands
- Western
- Yorkshire

The Specialist Groups are:

- British Geophysical Association
- British Sedimentological Research Group
- British Society for Geomorphology
- Contaminated Land Group
- Earth Systems Science Group
- Energy Group
- Engineering Group
- Forensic Geoscience Group
- Geochemistry Group
- Geological Curators' Group
- Geological Society Business Forum
- Geological Society Discussion Group
- Geological Remote Sensing Group
- Geoscience Information Group
- History of Geology Group
- Hydrogeological Group
- Marine Studies Group
- Metamorphic Studies Group
- Mineral Deposits Studies Group
- Near Surface Geophysics Group
- Quaternary Research Association
- Tectonic Studies Group
- Volcanic & Magmatic Studies Group

== Publications ==
The society publishes two of its own journals, the (formerly Quarterly) Journal of the Geological Society and the Quarterly Journal of Engineering Geology & Hydrogeology. It also publishes the magazine Geoscientist for Fellows, and has a share in Geology Today, published by Wiley.

It also co-publishes journals and publishes on behalf of other organisations. These include Petroleum Geoscience with the European Association of Geoscientists and Engineers; Geochemistry: Exploration, Environment, Analysis with the Association of Applied Geochemists; Journal of Micropalaeontology for The Micropalaeontological Society; Proceedings of the Yorkshire Geological Society for the Yorkshire Geological Society; and Scottish Journal of Geology for the Geological Societies of Edinburgh and Glasgow.

== Past presidents ==
The society counts many famous geologists amongst its past presidents. These include pioneers of geology William Buckland, Adam Sedgwick, Roderick Impey Murchison, Charles Lyell, Henry Thomas De la Beche, Thomas Henry Huxley, Joseph Prestwich, Archibald Geikie, Jethro Teall, and Charles Lapworth. Later well-known names include Alfred Harker, Arthur Elijah Trueman, Herbert Harold Read, Frederick Shotton, and Janet Watson.

== Scientific awards and funds ==
In 1831, it began issuing an annual scientific award for geology, known as the Wollaston Medal. This is still the Society's premier medal, which in 2006 was awarded to James Lovelock, the originator of the Gaia hypothesis.

=== Medals awarded by the Society ===
- Aberconway Medal
- Bigsby Medal
- Dewey Medal
- Distinguished Service Award
- Lyell Medal
- Major John Sacheverell A'Deane Coke Medal
- Major Edward D'Ewes Fitzgerald Coke Medal
- Murchison Medal
- President's Awards
- Prestwich Medal
- R. H. Worth Award
- Sue Tyler Friedman Medal
- William Smith Medal
- Wollaston Medal

=== Funds administered by the Society ===
- Lyell Fund
- Murchison Fund
- Wollaston Fund
- William Smith Fund

== Bibliography ==
- Herries Davies, G.L. (2007) Whatever is Under the Earth: The Geological Society of London 1807 to 2007, London : Geological Society, ISBN 1-86239-214-5

== See also ==
- Geology of Great Britain
- Journal of the Geological Society
- William Smith (geologist)
- List of presidents of the Geological Society of London
