= Askesian Society =

Historic debating society in London

The Askesian Society — was a debating club for scientific thinkers in London (1796–1807). The name was taken from the Greek term Askesis, meaning 'training' or 'application'.

== History ==
Founded on 23 March 1796 in London.

It was founded by William Allen, who allowed the use of his laboratory at No. 2 Plough Court for the society's scientific experiments. The other two principal founders were Richard Phillips and William Haseldine Pepys, both Quakers from the Lombard Street area.

The club was formed to fill the void after the departure of Bryan Higgins and his chemistry lectures.

Members had to present a paper or pay a fine, which led to Luke Howard's 1802 presentation On The Modification of Clouds, which established the still used terms "stratus," "cumulus," and "cirrus."

They often held theatres for "laughing gas evenings", where members would watch as fellows would sup nitrous oxide and stumble around the stage.

The Society disbanded in 1807, with many of its members going on to join the Mineralogical Society, the Geological Society, the Linnean Society and the Royal Society of London.
