= Ekofisk Formation =

Geological formation of Danian (lowermost Paleocene) age

- Stratigraphic range: Danian
- Type: Geological formation
- Unit of: Chalk Group
- Underlies: Våle Formation
- Overlies: Tor Formation
- Thickness: up to 150 metres (490 ft)

Lithology
- Primary: Chalk
- Other: Marl

Location
- Region: North Sea
- Country: Denmark, Netherlands, Norway & United Kingdom

Type section
- Named for: Ekofisk field
- Location: Well 2/4-5. Norwegian sector

The Ekofisk Formation is a geological formation of Danian (lowermost Paleocene) age. It forms the uppermost part of the Chalk Group in the North Sea. It is an important reservoir for oil and gas in fields such as Ekofisk. It overlies the Maastrichtian Tor Formation with local evidence of unconformity. It underlies the Våle Formation.
