= Corbulamella =

Corbulamella Temporal range: 99.6–48.6 Ma

Scientific classification
- Domain: Eukaryota
- Kingdom: Animalia
- Phylum: Mollusca
- Class: Bivalvia
- Order: Myida
- Family: Corbulidae
- Genus: †Corbulamella; Meek & Hayden 1857

Species
- †Corbulamella palaeocenica Garvie, 2021; †Corbulamella plateaui (Cossmann, 1902)

Extinct genus of bivalves

Corbulamella is a genus of extinct bivalves in the family Corbulidae.
