= Richard Phillips (chemist) =

British chemist (1778 – 1851)

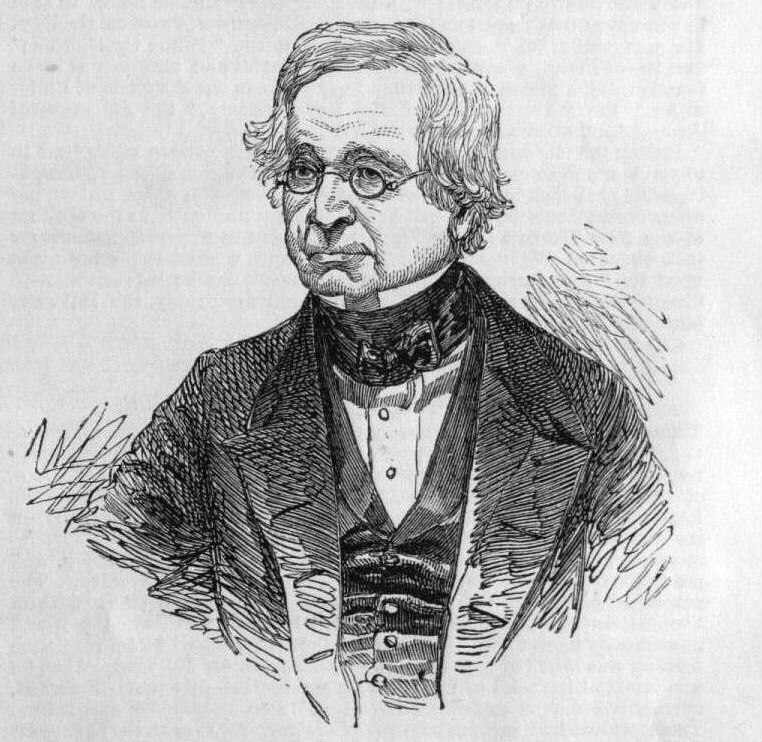
Richard Phillips

Richard Phillips FRS FRSE FCS FGS (21 November 1778 – 11 May 1851), was a distinguished British chemist and became a fellow of the Royal Society in 1822.

== Early life ==
Born in Lombard Street, London on 21 November 1778, he was the son of James Phillips (1745–1799), a printer and bookseller and his wife, Mary. He trained in London, receiving his education as a chemist under George Fordyce and William Allen.

In 1796, he and his brother William, together with William Allen and Luke Howard, took part in forming the Askesian Society. He then went on to be founder member of the Geological Society after the Askesian Society disbanded in 1807.

== Academic work ==
A talented chemist, he lectured in chemistry at Royal London Hospital from 1817 and was employed as a professor at Royal Military College in 1818. His proficiency was recognised when he was elected as a fellow of the Royal Society of Edinburgh in 1819, having been proposed by Thomas Allan, Leonard Horner and Sir David Brewster and as a fellow of the Royal Society in 1822. Around this time, he became an editor at Annals of Philosophy and later joint-editor at Philosophical Magazine, publishing papers in both.

== Later life ==
He was appointed chemist and curator to the Museum of Economic Geology (later the Museum of Practical Geology, later the Geological Museum), at Charing Cross in 1839 and stayed in this position until his death. He married Ann Rickman on 14 April 1807. He died on 11 May 1851 in Camberwell and was buried in Norwood Cemetery.

== Other ==
He was one of the founding members of the Chemical Society in 1841 and became its president in 1849, holding the position until his death. He was also prominent in the British Association.

Phillips was a Quaker and a friend of Michael Faraday. His paternal grandfather was William Phillips, husband of Catherine Payton Phillips, a Quaker travelling Minister (his late second marriage).

== Works ==
- A Translation of the Pharmacopoeia of the Royal College of Physicians, of London, 1824 : with Notes and Illustrations. Phillips, London 1824 Digital edition by the University and State Library Düsseldorf
- Translation of the Pharmacopoeia of the Royal College of Physicians of London 1836. 4. ed. Highley, London 1841 Digital edition by the University and State Library Düsseldorf
- Translation of the Pharmacopoeia of the Royal College of Physicians of London, 1851. London : Highley, 1851. Digital edition by the University and State Library Düsseldorf
