= Tor Formation =

Geological formation of Danian (lowermost Paleocene) age

- Stratigraphic range: Late Cretaceous Late Campanian–Maastrichtian
- Type: Geological formation
- Unit of: Chalk Group
- Underlies: Rødvig Formation and Ekofisk Formation
- Overlies: Hod Formation
- Thickness: up to 472 metres (1,550 ft)

Lithology
- Primary: Chalk

Location
- Region: North Sea
- Country: Denmark, Norway & United Kingdom

Type section
- Named for: Tor field
- Location: Well 1/3-1. Norwegian sector

The Tor Formation is a geological formation of late Campanian to Maastrichtian (uppermost Cretaceous) age. It forms the part of the Chalk Group in the North Sea. It is an important reservoir for oil and gas in fields such as Valhall. It overlies the Hod Formation. It underlies the Rødvig and Ekofisk Formations with local evidence of unconformity.

== See also ==
- Tyne, Trent and Tors gas fields
- Tor oil field
