= Gas/oil ratio =

Measurement in oil production

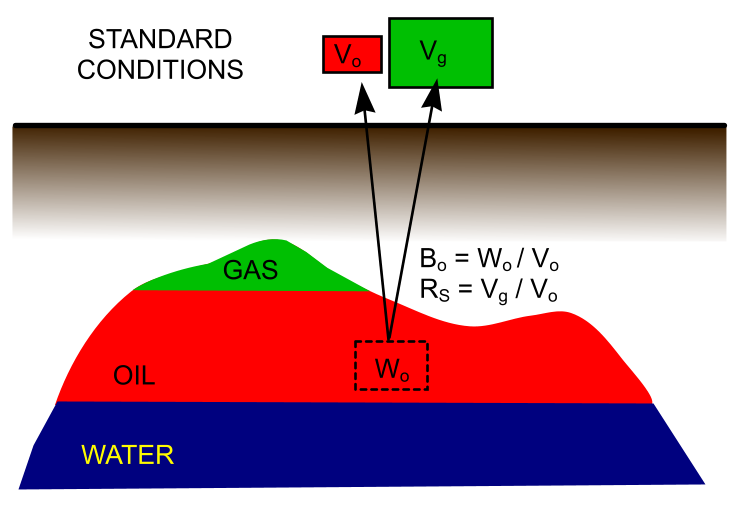
Definition of formation volume factor Bo and gas/oil ratio Rs for oil

When oil is produced to surface temperature and pressure it is usual for some natural gas to come out of solution. The gas/oil ratio (GOR) is the ratio of the volume of gas ("scf") that comes out of solution to the volume of oil — at standard conditions.

In reservoir simulation gas/oil ratio is usually abbreviated $R_s$.

A point to check is whether the volume of oil is measured before or after the gas comes out of solution, since the remaining oil volume will decrease when the gas comes out.

In fact, gas dissolution and oil volume shrinkage will happen at many stages during the path of the hydrocarbon stream from reservoir through the wellbore and processing plant to export. For light oils and rich gas condensates the ultimate GOR of export streams is strongly influenced by the efficiency with which the processing plant strips liquids from the gas phase. Reported GORs may be calculated from export volumes, which may not be at standard conditions.

The GOR is a dimensionless ratio (volume per volume) in metric units, but in field units, it is usually quoted in cubic feet of gas (at standard conditions: 0°C, 100 kPa) per barrel of oil or condensate, scf/bbl.

In the states of Texas and Pennsylvania, the statutory definition of a gas well is one where the GOR is greater than 100,000 ft^{3}/bbl or 100 Kcf/bbl. The state of New Mexico also designates a gas well as having over 100 MCFG per barrel.

The Oklahoma Geological Survey in 2015 published a map that displays gas wells with greater than 20 MCFG per barrel of oil. They go on to display oil wells with GOR of less than 5 MCFG/BBL and oil and gas wells between these limits.

The EPA's 2016 Information Collection Request for Oil and Gas Facilities (EPA ICR No. 2548.01, OMB Control No. 2060-NEW) divided well types into five categories: 1. Heavy Oil (GOR ≤ 300 scf/bbl) 2. Light Oil (GOR 300 < GOR ≤ 100,000 scf/bbl) 3. Wet Gas (100,000 < GOR ≤1,000,000 scf/bbl) 4. Dry Gas (GOR > 1,000,000 scf/bbl) 5. Coal Bed Methane.

== Bibliography ==
- Bradley, Howard B. (1987). Petroleum Engineering Handbook. Richardson, Texas: Society of Petroleum Engineers. ISBN 1-55563-010-3.
