= Bergen Airport (disambiguation) =

Bergen Airport normally refers to Bergen Airport, Flesland.

It may also refer to:

- Bergen Airport, Hjellestad, a former water aerodrome
- Bergen Airport, Sandviken, a water aerodrome
- Bergen Heliport, Grønneviksøren, a medical heliport
- Bergen Heliport, Nygårdstangen, a former medical heliport
- Bergen Heliport, University Hospital, a medical helipad at Haukeland University Hospital
- Flatøy Airport, a former military water aerodrome
- Herdla Airport, a former military airport
