= Trondheim Airport, Jonsvatnet =

Trondheim Airport, Jonsvatnet Trondheim sjøflyplass, Jonsvatnet
- IATA: none; ICAO: none

Summary
- Airport type: Public
- Serves: Trondheim
- Location: Valset, Jonsvatnet, Trondheim, Norway
- Coordinates: 63°23′27″N 010°33′11″E

Map
- Location in Norway

Runways
Direction	Length		Surface
Direction	m	ft	Surface
			Water

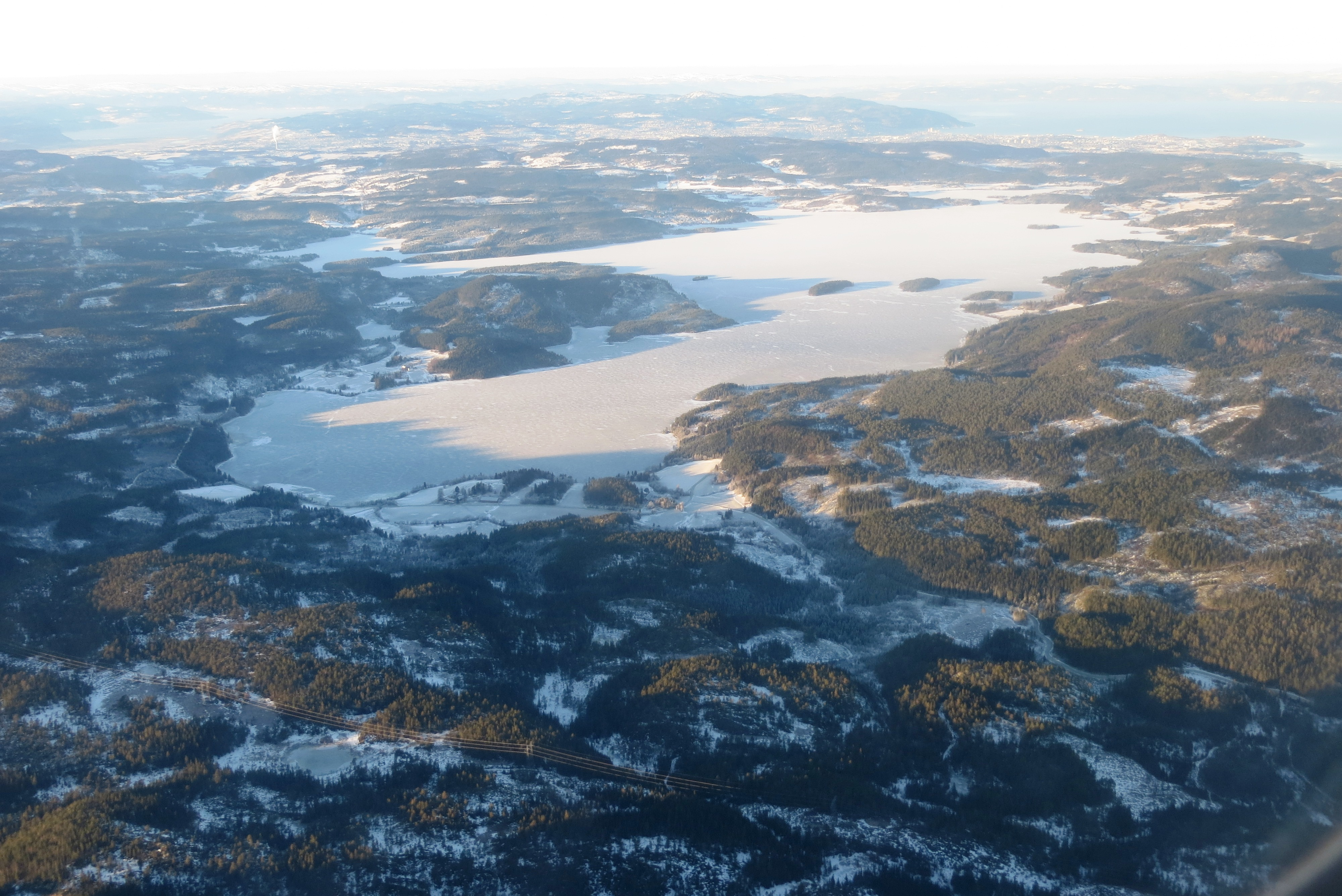
Aerial view of a frozen Jonsvatnet during winter. The city can be seen in the background.

Trondheim Airport, Jonsvatnet (Norwegian: Trondheim sjøflyplass, Jonsvatnet) was a water aerodrome located at Valset on the lake of Jonsvatnet in Trondheim, Norway. The airport was built as the first permanent airport serving Trondheim and initially was used for Norwegian Air Lines' (DNL) routes which commenced in 1935. Ahead of the 1936 season, the airport was equipped with permanent installations, including wharfs and a small terminal building. In 1937, the airport was used by Widerøe, before DNL returned the following year.

During World War II, the airport was taken over by the Luftwaffe, which used the ice on the lake as an airfield. Two aircraft which sank when the ice thawed were raised in 2004. Jonsvatnet was expanded and became a reserve airport for Trondheim Airport, Hommelvik, and Trondheim Airport, Ilsvika. After the war ended the airport was largely left unmaintained, but was variously used by DNL and later Vestlandske Luftfartsselskap as a reserve airport until 1957. The aviation club Trondheim Flyklubb reopened the airport in 1967 and remained there until 2013, when the airport was closed, since the airport's existence was incompatible with Jonsvatnet serving as the main source of drinking water for Trondheim.

== History ==
=== Construction and early years ===
Norway Post took the initiative to start an airline service from Bergen via Trondheim to Tromsø, which would allow a letter to travel between Bergen and Tromsø in two days, rather than eight. Norwegian Air Lines (DNL) received a concessional monopoly on all scheduled air services in Norway from 1935, and the postal service contracted DNL to operate a route to Northern Norway. Several places were considered, such as Skansen, which was located in the city center on the Trondheimsfjord. However, DNL considered that the fjord was not sufficiently protected against the elements, had too large waves and too much ship traffic. The airline therefore chose a site at Valsen on the shore of Jonsvatnet. The decision was made only days before the maiden flight.

The initial service commenced on 7 July 1935 and was operated using an eight-passenger Junkers W 34, Ternen. The first flight came at a time with fog in Trondheim and the pilot chose to land at Skansen instead of Jonsvatnet, as he claimed he could not find the lake in the fog. As there were no available boats and—as determined after a short while—the lake was not fog-covered, the aircraft flew onwards to Jonsvatnet. DNL hired two pilots for the route; they swapped places in Trondheim. The service had three weekly round-trip flights, with stops in Bergen, Ålesund, Molde, Kristiansund, Brønnøysund, Sandnessjøen, Bodø, Svolvær, Narvik, Harstad and Tromsø. Twelve flights in each direction were carried out that season, ending on 3 August.

The trial operation was successful and DNL and the postal service decided to commence permanent services from the following season. The city engineer was given the responsibility to plan an airport. He noted that there were plans for an airport to be built at Heimdal, but that such an airport would be at least five years away. The port authority had considered the possibility of using Ilsvika on the fjord, but the site was exposed to waves and would need the expansion of a causeway. Three locations at Jonsvatnet were considered: Valsetbukta, Kulsetbuka and Jervan. The former was found to be best suited and was also the closest to the city. Unlike during the trial flights the city concluded that the airport would need infrastructure to support operations. These included a floating wharf, a slipway to avoid aircraft being damaged if they should blow on land and a terminal building.

The plans were approved by the municipal council in February 1936, allowing construction of the 18,000-Norwegian krone project to commence. Two-thirds of the investments went to building the floating wharfs. The terminal cost NOK 4,600, NOK 600 was used for an outhouse and a tool shed. NOK 700 was invested in providing water and sewer lines to the site and the last NOK 100 was used to upgrade the road. This was in contrast to most of the other water aerodromes along the coast, which lacked a wharf to which the aircraft could dock. The airport and the DNL route with the three-engine Junkers Ju 52 Havørn were opened on 7 June 1936. The first season there were three weekly round trips. Havørn crashed with the mountain of Lihesten on 16 June, killing all on board in the Havørn Accident. Therefore, Ternen was put into service on the route until a new Ju 52, Falken, entered service on 28 June. The service was only flown for the summer.

The airport had a manager, an assistant, a radio telegraphist and ground handling crew. Operation of the airport was carried out by the airline, which received a subsidy of NOK 1,400 from Trondheim Municipality. This included NOK 300 in rent. DNL chose Det Nordenfjeldske Dampskipsselskap (NFDS) as their handling agent in town, a shipping company which was also a minority owner of DNL. NFDS offered an airport bus service from their offices in town 35 minutes before departure and 30 minutes before from Britannia Hotel. Passengers were offered breakfast at the hotel. NFDS subcontracted the airport bus to Styrkaar Melbye, who held the concession to operate a scheduled service to Jonsvatnet. The farm of Valset provided rooms for airline personnel stationed at the airport and provided catering for passengers.

For the 1937 season the service was taken over by Widerøe, flew a route from Trondheim via Brønnøysund and Sandnessjøen to Bodø using a Bellanca 31-40. The route commenced on 3 July and flew five round trips per week until the season was completed on 30 September. The 1936 schedule was reintroduced in 1938, with DNL providing three weekly services between Bergen and Tromsø. In addition, Widerøe flew a post-only service the opposite direction each day. In 1938 the municipal grants had increased to NOK 6,782, increasing to NOK 7,600 the following year. This was in part because the government required increased municipal contribution to the routes, which were largely financed through state subsidies.

=== World War II ===
With the German invasion starting on 9 April 1940, the Luftwaffe had initially intended to use Værnes Air Station as its main stronghold for operating aircraft of the 10th Air Corps in Trøndelag. Contrary to their intelligence statements, Værnes was in a dilapidated state, lacking such amenities as a paved runway. The Luftwaffe therefore looked around for other suitable sites to allow them to continue battle in the Norwegian Campaign. All supplies would need to be flown in to Trøndelag until 13 April, and it was therefore imperative for the Wehrmacht that an air base be established in the region.

The Wehrmacht, therefore, decided the following day that it would use the iced up lake of Jonsvatnet as a temporary air station, located between Valset and Malmannøya. The ice was still thick on the lake, about one meter (three feet), giving sufficient support for the Luftwaffe to land heavy bombers at Jonsvatnet. On 11 April 18 Junkers Ju 52 aircraft from landed. A defensive installation was established and later Junkers Ju 88A-1 and Heinkel He 111H aircraft from Kampfgeschwader 26 and Kampfgeschwader 30 landed. These were also operating out of Sola Air Station. Jonsvatnet was among other tasks set to refuel aircraft which were used for bombing targets further north. British and French troops landed in the Namsos area on 14 April, causing an increase in German air activity. On 15 April, some of the Ju 88s participated on the bombing of a radio mast in the Namsos Campaign. The following day, the Royal Air Force's No. 77 Squadron conducted reconnaissance of Jonsvatnet with their Armstrong Whitworth Whitleys. That day, the airport was also used to refuel He 111s returning from the Battle of Narvik. Jonsvatnet is further reinforced with five Junkers Ju 87s from Stukageschwader 1.

On 17 April, a Ju 87 was dispatched to conduct bombings during the Battle of Hegra Fortress. A damaged Ju 88 crashed during landing and was dismantled for usable spare parts. On 18 April, the Ju 88s were used against Allied troops near Namsos and the Heinkel aircraft bombed twenty Allied ships in Namsfjorden. At the most, there were 36 aircraft at Jonsvatnet. On 20 April, two waves of attacks were carried out from Jonsvatnet to Allied positions in Namsos and Steinkjer. The first wave consisted of eighteen aircraft, the second of twenty-six. Amongst the achievements is the bombing to ruins of Namsos. Attacks also targeted Allied ships, and the bombers were successful at sinking Rutlandshire of the Royal Navy. Upon arrival an He 111 slid through the ice. The aircraft proved salvageable and it was instead stripped of key components before it sank. Three Whitleys of the No. 102 Squadron RAF attempted to bomb Jonsvatnet, but failed to hit relevant targets.

On 21 April, the attacks continued on Namsos and Åndalsnes. Two British ships, Penn and Hercules II, were hit. A Ju 87A had its nose fall through the ice. It was scavenged for all valuable spare parts before the airframe sank. The following day, a Messerschmitt Bf 109 crashed upon landing, ending upside down. Whitleys from the No. 625 Squadron RAF conducted reconnaissance on the airfield and concluded that there were sixteen aircraft still stationed there. However, the ice was beginning to melt and the Luftwaffe determined to start evacuation of the airfield, moving the aircraft to Værnes. A British reconnaissance mission on 25 April concluded that only two aircraft were left and that the airport was generally abandoned. An 800-meter (2,600 ft) wooden runway at Værnes was completed on 28 April.

Soon the ice began to melt and crack, making the airfield unsuitable for aircraft operations. The Heinkel He 111 and Junkers Ju 88 aircraft were unable to take off and were, after their fuel tanks had been emptied, abandoned by the Luftwaffe and sank soon afterwards, to a depth of 74 meters (243 ft).

The German forces chose to not use Jonsvatnet as a primary civilian water aerodrome. Instead, it constructed such a facility at Trondheim Airport, Hommelvik and moved civilian flights there. Construction of a water aerodrome on Jonsvatnet commenced in May. The Valset area was taken over by the Luftwaffe and used as a recreational area for German soldiers. The airport was gradually expanded with a major complex of floating wharfs with three connectors to land. There were also built auxiliary installations. The work was completed in 1942. However, Jonsvatnet remained a reserve airport, with Ilsvika and Hommelvik remaining the primary water aerodromes. From 1943, there were upgrades to the defenses and communications systems, including the construction of four antenna masts.

=== Reserve airport ===
After the war ended, DNL resumed flights from Trondheim in 1946, this time using Ilsvika as its main airport. Jonsvatnet was relegated to a reserve airport. With DNL introducing the larger Short Sandringham flying boats in 1947, Hommelvik was used. Jonsvatnet was not maintained, and by 1949 it was sufficiently dilapidated that it could no longer be used as a reserve. The wharfs were therefore demolished. DNL merged to form Scandinavian Airlines System in 1951 and moved all its services to the land airport of Trondheim Airport, Værnes the following year.

Vestlandske Luftfartsselskap started a seaplane service from Bergen via Ålesund, Molde and Kristiansund to Trondheim on 14 May 1951. They also used Hommelvik as their primary airport, but chose to reinstate Jonsvatnet as their reserve. They therefore built a new and considerably smaller wharf at Valset. The service was flown using eight-passenger Short Sealand flying boats. Vestlandske terminated their operations in 1957, and the company filed for bankruptcy. Jonsvatnet has since not been used for commercial aviation.

=== Trondheim Flyklubb ===
The aviation club signed a lease for lakeside property at Valset in 1967, intending to relocate their operations from Værnes to Jonsvatnet. A shed was donated to the club, and they established a base for their seaplanes and for the northernmost seaplane pilot school in the country. The club bought its first seaplane in 1967 and replaced it with a Cessna 180 five years later. The club received a building permit for a hangar at Valset in 1970, but lacked financial strength to actually build it. In 1974, a private Piper PA-18 Super Cub was stationed at Jonsvatnet, and among other uses it was used for pilot training. During the 1970s, the airline Trønderfly used Jonsvatnet for its Cessna 206 seaplane operations. The airline was allowed free use of the aerodrome in exchange for the club having free use of a hangar at Værnes during the winter. From 1977, a law restricting motorized transport in the wilderness was passed, which severely limited the use of seaplanes and resulted in Trønderfly terminating its seaplane operations a few years later.

Freighting aviation fuel to the aerodrome was one of the most challenging aspects of operating the airport. At first, the club freighted up fuel in barrels, but the fire department soon placed restrictions on this activity. The club then started filling at Værnes, where Shell would drive their 10,000 liters (2,200 imp gal; 2,600 U.S. gal) fuel truck along a narrow dirt road to fill 80 liters (18 imp gal; 21 U.S. gal) the aircraft during high tide at the mouth of Stjørdalselva. Shell announced that they would terminate this service from 1982, and the club received permission to bury a 6,000-liter (1,300 imp gal; 1,600 U.S. gal) tank at Valset. During the 1980s and 1990s, the airport typically saw between 130 and 200 flight hours per year.

Investigations of the aircraft wrecks were carried out by the Armed Forces Museum in 1986, which in cooperation with the NTNU Museum of Natural History and Archaeology succeeded at finding both the Heinkel and the Junkers. They were documented using a remotely operated underwater vehicle. The issue lay at rest until 1994, when Forsvarets Forum questioned whether the wrecks were a threat to the lake as a drinking water source. The authorities concluded that the wrecks were not a threat to the water quality. The Norwegian Aviation Museum received permission from the Ministry of Defense in 1995 to raise the wrecks, as they never determined what to do with the aircraft.

Jonsvatnet is the main water abstraction source for drinking water in Trondheim. As such, there have since the 1960s been extensive restrictions on the lake, including bans on any motorized boats and bathing in the lake. However, there were contradictions in restrictions: domesticated cows were allowed to bathe, but not humans, and all motor boat activities were banned, although the lake acted as a water aerodrome. The city asked the club in 1999 to start looking for another site for a water aerodrome. The municipal council therefore withdrew the airport's concession in March 2003, effective at the end of the year. However, by August the decision had been reverted by the Civil Aviation Authority (CAA). They gave a ten-year concession in 2005, but this was appealed by the municipality to the Ministry of Transport and Communications. During the public hearing, the Ministry of the Environment supported the municipality's stance, stating that the lake, as a recreational and nature area, should be shielded from use by seaplanes.

The military received permission in 2003 to carry out more detailed searches for aircraft in the lake. An area of 54 hectares (130 acres) was searched, in which a He 111 and a Ju 88, both found in 1986, were identified. Remains of a Ju 88 and Ju 52 were found, although the latter had been crushed when additional pipes had been laid at a previous date. Another presumed sunk Ju 87 and a Bf 109 were never found, although far from all of the lake had been searched.

Plans for raising the wrecks resumed in 2004, after the German Museum of Technology in Berlin offered to pay the cost of the work. They lacked a He 111 in their collection and were willing to trade an airworthy Lockheed F-104 Starfighter to the Norwegian Armed Forces Aircraft Collection in exchange for the two wrecks. Norwegian aviation museums had both a He 111 and Ju 88 and were therefore not interested in paying the cost of retrieving them. The operation received support from the municipality and the Food Safety Authority, although it was opposed by Nature and Youth and the Museum of Natural History and Archaeology, who both stated that the process could pollute more than the aircraft just lying there. The museum also questioned if sending wrecks to Germany was good heritage management.

The military invited Artur von Casimir, the Heinkel's last pilot, to witness the operation, which commenced on 24 August 2004. The lifting was carried out using a crane and eight pontoons from the military, and the Heinkel broke the surface on 3 September. It was then dismounted on the beach by representatives from the museum. The Ju 88 surfaced on 6 September. The operation was concluded on 15 September with the raising of a tail of a Ju 87 and three Junkers Jumo 211 engines. All the aircraft were well-preserved because of the water's constant temperature and low oxygen content.

The Ministry of Transport and Communications determined in 2007 that the airport would have to close at the end of the 2013 season. The club appealed to Ombudsman for Public Administration, who determined that the ministry would have to consider the issue once more. In 2010, the Food Safety Authority stated that the airport was a threat to the water quality and that water quality was a primary public concern, supporting the closing of the airport from 2013. The concession ended in 2013 and a renewal was finally rejected by the city in August 2013. This time the CAA supported the motion of closure, citing reasons of general public interests. The club has not found a new location for its seaplanes.

== Facilities ==
The water aerodrome is located at Valset on the shore of Litjvatn, a bay of Jonsvatnet. Since 1967 it was operated by Trondheim Flyklubb, who in later years had two Cessna 180 aircraft stationed. The season lasted from May through October and saw between 80 and 120 flight hours per month during the season.
