= Bergen Airport, Hjellestad =

- IATA: none; ICAO: none

Summary
- Airport type: Public
- Serves: Bergen, Norway
- Location: Hjellestad, Fana Municipality
- Elevation AMSL: 0 m / 0 ft
- Coordinates: 60.2559°N 005.2399°E

Map

Runways
Direction	Length		Surface
Direction	m	ft	Surface
			Water

Bergen Airport, Hjellestad (Norwegian: Bergen sjølufthavn, Hjellestad) was a water airport serving Bergen, Norway from 1948 through 1951. Located at Hjellestad in Fana Municipality, the airport was variously used by Norwegian Air Lines (DNL), Scandinavian Airlines System (SAS), Widerøe and West Norway Airlines for seaplane routes eastwards to Oslo, southwards to Haugesund and Stavanger, and northwards to Ålesund, Kristiansund and Trondheim.

Bergen Airport, Sandviken proved too small for DNL's routes with the introduction of the Short Sandringham, most due to ship traffic in the area. The airport at Hjellestad opened on 23 August 1948. It consisted of a small cabin used as a control tower, a small terminal building. Smaller aircraft could dock at a floating wharf, while the larger Sandringhams anchored at a buoy. The airport was closed in 1951, after DNL closed its Oslo routes and traffic moved back to Sandviken.

== History ==
Bergen Airport, Sandviken was the first water airport to serve the city, with services commencing in 1934. Although it was close to the city center, this also meant that the airport's runway took up central parts of Byfjorden. With increased use of aircraft, they became a safety hazard on the fjord. The operations were distributed, as the air traffic control was located at Herdla Airport on Askøy. Herdla was considered, but its runway was too rudimentary and the airport was far from the city. Although closer, Bergen Naval Air Station on Flatøy also needed to be reached with a ferry.

The authorities therefore decided to establish a water airport at Hjellestad. This would allow air traffic control and terminal to be co-located and ensured that traffic could continue to increase. The airport was scheduled for completion for 1 June 1948, in time for the summer season operations, but it did not open until 23 August.

The municipality had ambitions to make Hjellestad the largest water airport in the country. The plans included building a causeway to the island of Dronningen, which would have cost several million Norwegian krone. The rationale was that Bergen was all of cities of similar size in Norway had a land airport. By 1950 the expansion plans were shelved to allow the funding to be used to build a land airport instead.

The busiest route the service to Oslo Airport, Fornebu. It was flown by Norwegian Air Lines using a 37-passenger Short Sandringham. Flight time was seventy minutes. From 1950 the route passed to Scandinavian Airlines, who transported 3,504 passengers to Oslo that year. The Sandringhams continued northwards via Ålesund Airport, Sørneset and Kristiansund to Trondheim Airport, Værnes, and onwards northwards. Southwards the service flew via Haugesund Airport, Storesundsskjær to Stavanger Airport, Sola. This was flown using the smaller Junkers Ju 52 with capacity for seventeen passengers.

The route operators shifted in 1950. The route to Trondheim was taken over by West Norway Airlines, which used a Short Sealand. The southbound route to Stavanger was taken over by Widerøe, using a Noorduyn Norseman. SAS continued flying to Oslo for another two seasons. Ahead of the 1952 season SAS wanted to retire its Sandringham fleet. It therefore terminated the lease of the airport from the end of the 1951 season. Instead they flew passengers to Stavanger by land planes and onwards with West Norway Airlines to Sandviken, who took over the route from Widerøe. The terminal building and docks were demolished in the late 1950s and all that remains today is the café and the flag pole.

== Facilities ==
The airport was situated at Hjellestad in Fana Municipality (today this is in Bergen Municipality). Ownership of the airport was however under that of Bergen Municipality and based on leases paid for by DNL.

Smaller aircraft, such as the Ju 52 and Sealands, docked as a floating dock at the quay. The Sandringhams were too large for this, and docked at a buoy in the bay. The airport operated a boat which ferried passengers and cargo to and from the aircraft. There was a small terminal building on the quay, which was run by DNL. The airlines also organized bus transport to the city center.

The control tower was located in a cabin which was placed on a hill shelf overlooking the quay at Hjellestad. A radio mast was erected at Sandkleivane and a windsock installed don Kuholmen. Non-directional beacons were installed at Espeland and Bjelkarøy. Ship traffic near Hjellestad had to be alerted in case of incoming flights; this was announced through the hoisting of a black and yellow ball on the flag pole at the control tower.
