= Ålesund Airport, Sørneset =

Ålesund Airport, Sørneset Ålesund sjøflyplass, Sørneset
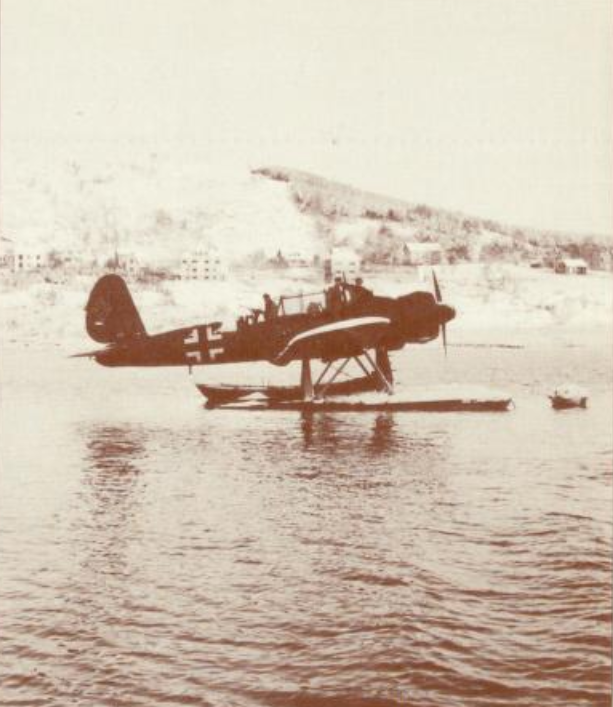
- Luftwaffe Arado Ar 196 at the airport during the 1940s
- IATA: none; ICAO: none

Summary
- Airport type: Private
- Serves: Ålesund, Norway
- Location: Sørneset, Ålesund
- Elevation AMSL: 0 m (0 ft)
- Coordinates: 62.46868°N 6.22640°E

Map
- Location in Norway

Runways
Direction	Length		Surface
Direction	m	ft	Surface
			Water

Ålesund Airport, Sørneset (Norwegian: Ålesund sjøflyplass, Sørneset) was a water aerodrome and later heliport situated at Nørvevika and later Sørneset in Ålesund, Norway. The airport was, to a varying degree, used between 1929 and 1979. It has since been demolished.

The first use of Nørvevika was in November 1929 as a temporary base for the Royal Norwegian Navy Air Service. When Norwegian Air Lines commenced scheduled flights along the coast in 1935, they also took the facilities into use. The Navy Air Service returned in 1939 and decided to build a base, but there was no time to carry out the plans before the German invasion the following year. The Luftwaffe used the base for two Arado Ar 196 from 1941 to 1943, moving the base to Sørneset during the Second World War.

Lufttransport moved to the base in 1946 and carried out commercial flights in 1948 and 1949. After shutting down, these were taken over by Vestlandske Luftfartsselskap in 1950. They were retained until 1957, and the following season Ålesund Airport, Vigra opened. The final operator at Sørneset was Mørefly, who at first operated seaplanes and later focused on helicopters. They abandoned the site in 1979, moving to Vigra.

== History ==
=== Establishment ===
Sporadic flights with seaplanes to Ålesund started in 1920, although not with more than a few private flights per year. From November 1929 the Royal Norwegian Navy Air Service set up a base at Skutvika near the town center, which they used to search for herring. This base was found to be unsuitable due to the amount of ship traffic. When they returned the following year, the Herring Association had instead selected a more suitable base at Nørvevika. There they established a wooden shed with a tin roof, which acted as a hangar for two Hansa-Brandenburg W.33 aircraft. Due to harsh treatment the winter weather gave the aircraft, the air service terminated these operations the following year.

Norwegian Air Lines carried out a trial postal route from Ålesund to Tromsø for four weeks in 1934, using a Junkers W 34 from 7 June to 3 August. The trials were successful, and the following year the airline commenced flights with the larger Junkers Ju 52. The routes were summer-only; for instance, in 1938 they lasted from 4 April to 30 September. These services continued until 4 September 1939, when all commercial flights were banned.

The need for a naval seaplane base in Ålesund resumed in 1939. This was caused by the Phoney War and the need to station aircraft along the Møre og Romsdal coast to maintain Norwegian neutrality. Nørvevika was found to be the most suitable location and selected. Funding of 225,000 Norwegian krone was granted, which would include a hangar that could fit three Heinkel He 115 seaplanes. However, the entire issue was stopped during the expropriation process. The site had several owners, and one of them died in the process. No work had therefore been carried out upon the German invasion on 9 April 1940.

Luftwaffe started looking for a site for an airport between Bergen and Trondheim in January 1941. At first they suggested Spjelkavik, but this was changed and Aukra Airport, Gossen built instead. However, the Luftwaffe still needed a base for seaplanes to operate near Ålesund. For this they carried out the plans which the Naval Air Service had made and erected a seaplane base later in 1941. This was at first built at Nørvevika, but was later relocated slightly to Sørneset. The ships were anchored to a buoy and a barracks was built on land. It was manned with two Arado Ar 196 of 2. Kustenfliegergruppe 406. One of these crashed on 18 March 1943 at Rambjøra in Haram Municipality, killing both on board. The second crashed at Volsdalen in Ålesund on 18 October.

=== Scheduled services ===
The airline Lufttransport was founded in 1946 with a base at Sørneset. It eventually operated a fleet of four aircraft, including a Grumman Widgeon and a Fairchild 24. The airline built a hangar at the airport. It started a scheduled service to Oslo Airport, Fornebu three times a week in 1948, with stopovers in Molde and Kristiansund using the Widgeon. It also made attempts to fly to Bergen and Trondheim. However, the company had difficulties making a profit and shut down in 1949. Ownership of the airport passed to Ålesund Bil og Flyservice.

Vestlandske Luftfartselskap took over the coastal services in 1950. They operated summer routes from Bergen to Trondheim and hand intermediate stops in Ålesund and Kristiansund, later also in Molde. At first they used a four-passenger Republic RC-3 Seabee, later a Short SA.6 Sealand with twice the passenger capacity. The routes operated until 1957. They were considered taken over by Widerøe and Solbergfly, but the 1958 opening of Ålesund Airport, Vigra made this an implausible ordeal.

=== Mørefly ===
A group of enthusiasts bought a Luscombe 8 Silvaire and two years later they established the airline Mørefly. It took various general aviation contracted work, such as cargo transport, aerial photography and searching for herring steams. It also took over ownership of the airport. From 1957 they set up an air ambulance service out of Sørneset using a Seabee.

Mørefly continued to operate various general aviation services out of Sørneset. From 1966 it also became a heliport when Mørefly bought its first helicopter, a Bell 47G4. Operations included air ambulance, search and rescue, cargo transport, herring patrol, aerial photography and a scuba diver standby for the fishing fleet.

The airline decided in 1977 that it would relocate to Vigra. It built a new hangar there and relocated in 1979, abandoning Sørneset as an aerodrome. For a while the hangar was used by Ålesund Last og Buss. The hangar and barracks were still in place in 1988, but were in the early 1990s demolished and the area used for housing.

== Facilities ==
The water aerodrome was physically located at two different locations in the bay of Nørvevika. The first was named Nørvevik and the second Sørneset. Sørneset is a headland situated on the island of Nørvøya, between the Nørvevika and Nørvesundet. The water aerodrome consisted of a buoy, a slipway, a hangar and a barracks used for offices. In addition there was a small floating dock. From 1966 the aerodrome also featured a helipad.

== Bibliography ==
- Flatmark, Jan Olav (1988). Ålesund i hverdag og krig (in Norwegian). Ålesund: Nordvest Forlag. ISBN 82-90330-44-8.
- Grytten, Harald (1997). Byleksikon: Litt om mye i Ålesund (in Norwegian). Ålesund: Sunnmørsposten Forlag. ISBN 82-91450-05-6.
- Grytten, Harald (1998). Hjemsted og by: Ålesund 1948–1998 (in Norwegian). Vol. 1. Ålesund: Sunnmørsposten Forlag. ISBN 82-91450-06-4.
- Hafstad, Bjørn; Arheim, Tom (2003). Marinens flygevåpen 1912–1944 (in Norwegian). TankeStreken. ISBN 82-993535-1-3.
- Hjelle, Bjørn Owe (2007). Ålesund lufthavn Vigra (in Norwegian). Valderøya. ISBN 978-82-92055-28-1.
- Nerdrum, Johan (1986). Fugl fønix: En beretning om Det Norske Luftfartselskap (in Norwegian). Oslo: Gyldendal Norsk Forlag. ISBN 82-05-16663-3.
- Nilsen, Oddvar; Giske, Kari; Dybvik, Peder Otto (1998). Ålesund: om by og næringsliv (in Norwegian). Ålesund: Nordvestlandet Forlag. ISBN 82-90330-76-6.
