= Herdla Church =

Church in Vestland, Norway

- Herdla kirke
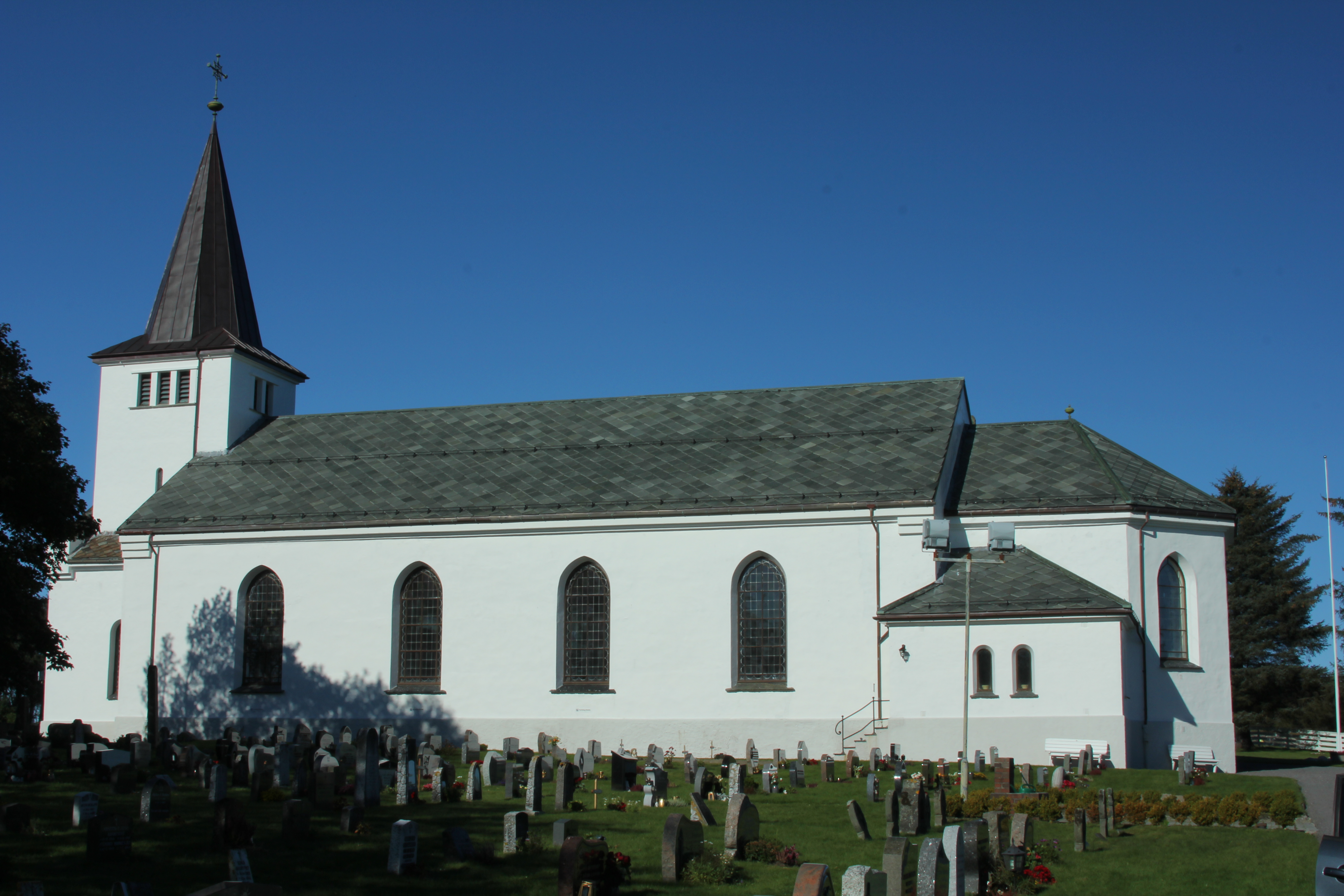
- View of the church
- Herdla Church
- 60°34′06″N 4°57′02″E
- Location: Askøy Municipality, Vestland
- Country: Norway
- Denomination: Church of Norway
- Previous denomination: Catholic Church
- Churchmanship: Evangelical Lutheran

History
- Status: Parish church
- Founded: 12th century
- Consecrated: 1863

Architecture
- Functional status: Active
- Architect: Christian Heinrich Grosch
- Architectural type: Long church
- Completed: 1863 (163 years ago)

Specifications
- Capacity: 540
- Materials: Stone

Administration
- Diocese: Bjørgvin bispedømme
- Deanery: Vesthordland prosti
- Parish: Herdla
- Norwegian Cultural Heritage Site
- Type: Church
- Status: Not protected
- ID: 84557

Herdla Church (Norwegian: Herdla kirke) is a parish church of the Church of Norway in Askøy Municipality in Vestland county, Norway. It is located on the small island of Herdla. It is the church for the Herdla parish which is part of the Vesthordland prosti (deanery) in the Diocese of Bjørgvin. The white, stone church was built in a long church design in 1863 using plans drawn up by the architect Christian Heinrich Grosch. The church seats about 540 people.

== History ==
The oldest existing written accounts of this church on Herdla is a letter from Pope Eugenius III in 1146 that mentions "St. Nicholas's Church on Herdla" Latin: Ecclesiam sancti Nicholai de hardle. The church was dedicated to Saint Nicholas of Myra, the patron saint of sailors. The church had similarities with Moster Church and Kinn Church, both stone churches without towers. The church belonged under Munkeliv monastery in the nearby city of Bergen. The monastery was founded by King Øystein I Magnusson around 1110. Herdla Church began as a small stone church in simple Romanesque style. Later, around 1300, the church was significantly rebuilt and enlarged in a Gothic style with pointed arches. (It is not clear whether or not this was an extensive renovation to enlarge the building or if it was a completely new building on the same site.)

Following storm damage, the church was demolished in 1861 and a larger church was built in 1863. The architect Christian Christie designed this church and a lot of the stone from the old church was reused in the construction of the new church. The new, stone long church had a nave with a choir on the east side of the nave. There was a sacristy on the south side of the choir and a church porch with a tower on the west end of the nave. The interior was restored in the autumn of 1910 under the direction of Jens Zetlitz Monrad Kielland. This church burned down in 1934, leaving only the exterior walls remaining after the fire.

After the fire, the church was rebuilt on the same foundation, reusing the same exterior walls using plans by the architect Ole Halvorsen. At the same time, a new sacristy was built on the north side of the choir (to match the existing one on the south side). The newly rebuilt church was consecrated on 22 September 1935. The church was nicknamed the "Øygard Cathedral". The church served most of the old Herdla Municipality which included parts of the present-day Øygarden Municipality, Askøy Municipality, and Alver Municipality. Originally, the church had a taller, steeper roof than the present church. During World War II, the church was seriously damaged. The Germans blew up the tower and the church was used to store ammunition and it was also used as horse stalls. Under the floor, a large tunnel system was built that went across the island, including underneath much of the cemetery. During the war years, the island of Herdla was used as a large airfield and the Germans blew off the tower because they were afraid that the church tower could serve as landmark for bombers who came from Britain.

After the war, the parish planned to demolish the whole church and build a new church on the same site, however, in the end, it was decided to rebuild using the old walls and foundation. The old walls were shortened by about 3.7 metres (12 ft), and a new roof and tower were constructed. The architect Ole Halvorsen led the reconstruction designs again. The newly rebuilt church can seat up to 600 people. It was consecrated on 1 April 1951 by the Bishop Ragnvald Indrebø. The church has a lower tower than before, because at that time there were plans to make Herdla the main airport for the city of Bergen. However, Herdla was ultimately not chosen and the airport was built in Flesland in 1955. In May 2008, the low church tower was removed and a larger tower was built, similar to the tower that the Germans blew up during World War II.

== Media gallery ==
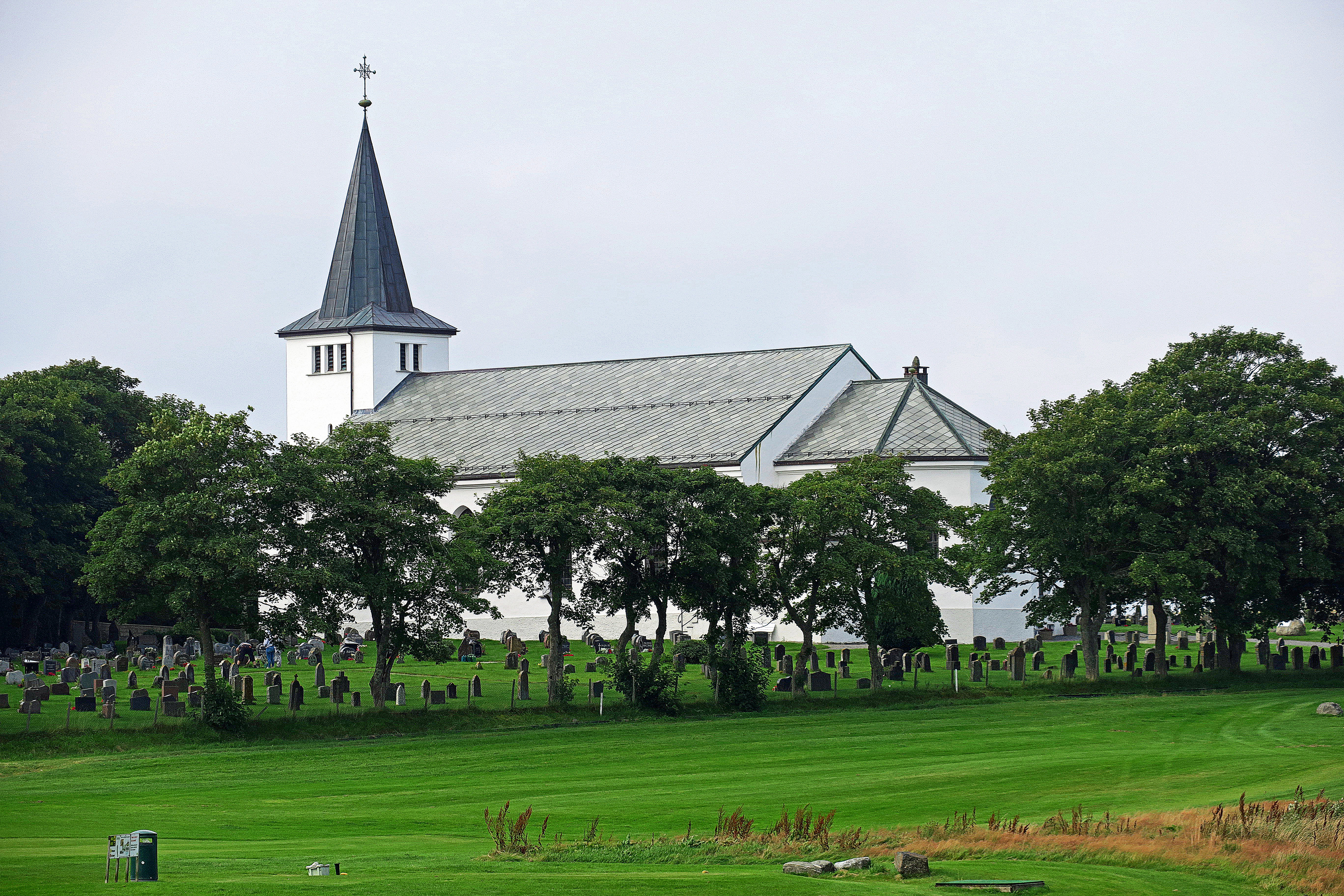

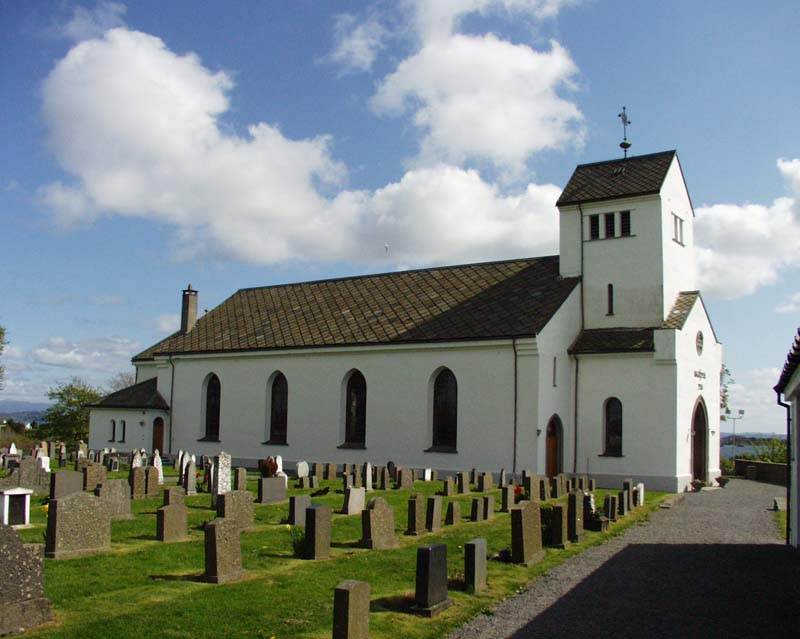

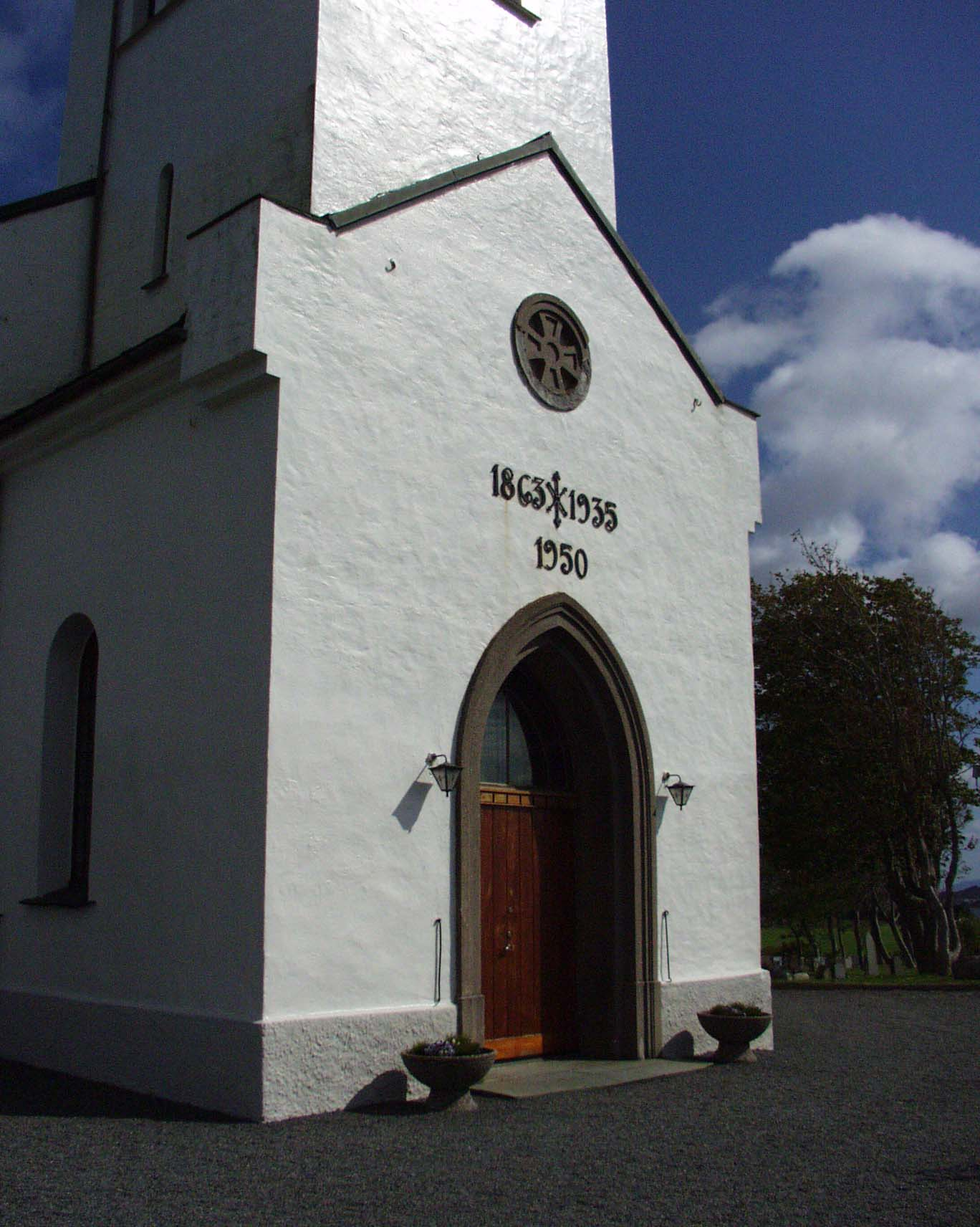

== See also ==
- List of churches in Bjørgvin
