= Haugesund Airport, Storesundsskjær =

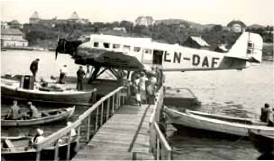
- IATA: none; ICAO: none

Summary
- Airport type: Public
- Owner: Haugesund Municipality
- Operator: Haugesund Port Authority
- Serves: Haugesund, Norway
- Location: Midtre Storesundsskjæret, Haugesund
- Elevation AMSL: 0 m / 0 ft
- Coordinates: 59.4014°N 005.2749°E

Map

Runways
Direction	Length		Surface
Direction	m	ft	Surface
			Water

Haugesund Airport, Storesundsskjær (Norwegian: Haugesund sjøflyhavn, Storesundsskjær) was a water aerodrome which served the town of Haugesund in Rogaland county, Norway, from 1936 to 1956. The airport consisted of a barge anchored at Midtre Storesundsskjær in Haugesund's port. Affixed was a floating dock and a terminal building.

Det Norske Luftfartsrederi flew to Haugesund in 1920. The service was resumed by Widerøe in 1934, although it was taken over by Norwegian Air Lines (DNL) the following year. Their larger Junkers Ju 52s caused the municipality to replace a buoy with a permanent airport. From 1940 to 1945 the airport was used by the Luftwaffe. DNL resumed flights from 1946 through 1949. Widerøe then resumed them in 1950. Finally, West Norway Airlines flew from 1952 through 1956.

== History ==
The first aviation services in Haugesund was in 1920, when Det Norske Luftfartsrederi commenced a coastal services from Stavanger via Haugesund to Bergen. Using a Supermarine Channel, the airline failed to make a profit and only operated for a single season. Services resumed on 17 June 1934, when Widerøe was granted a concession for a coastal route from Oslo to Haugesund. The route was kept operation through a state grant of 17,000 Norwegian krone per year. Flight time to Oslo was five hours and ten minutes. It was flown using a Waco Cabin with capacity for three passengers. The aerodrome in Haugesund initially consisted of a buoy anchored in the port. Ground handling was carried out by Paulsen & Semb.

The following season the route was taken over by Norwegian Air Lines. They had received a monopoly on all air services and bought a controlling stake in Widerøe. DNL introduced the eleven-passenger Junkers Ju 52 on the route, which ran from Oslo via Arendal, Kristiansand, Stavanger and Haugesund to Bergen. For this the simple buoy would no longer suffice, and the port authority commenced planning of a proper water aerodrome. As an interim solution a floating dock was installed.

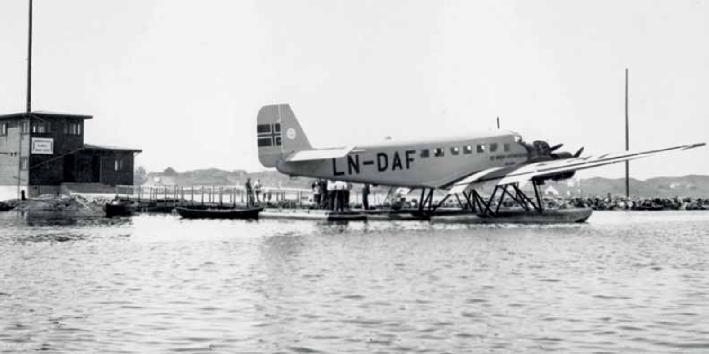
Norwegian Air Lines Junkers Ju 52 in 1936

As the increased traffic caused the need for a permanent aerodrome, Haugesund Municipality approved the construction of such a facility in 1935. A barge was anchored up at Midtre Storesundsskjær and a floating dock fastened to it. This also received a control and operations building. Construction cost NOK 15,000, which was financed by the municipality and various municipal agencies. The services only flew five months during the summer. The last flight before the break-out of the Second World War took place on 2 September 1939.

During the German occupation of Norway from 1940 to 1945 the Luftwaffe used the airport for Ju 52 transport seaplanes. DNL resumed flights out of Haugesund on 6 October 1946, this time with two daily round trips. DNL flew until the end of the 1949 summer season using the Ju 52. Widerøe took over the route for the 1950 season, using an eight-passenger Noorduyn Norseman. They failed to get ends to meet and operated only for a single season.

West Norway Airlines resumed the route in 1952. They used a Short Sealand flying boat and flew from Stavanger via Haugesund to Bergen, and continued northwards to Trondheim. The airline continued to operate on the route until 29 September 1956. Thereafter there were no regular flights out of the water aerodrome, and Haugesund was without scheduled services until the opening of Haugesund Airport, Karmøy on 8 April 1975.

== Facilities ==
The airport was located at Midtre Storesundsskjær in the port of Haugesund and was owned an operated by the municipal Haugesund Port Authority. The aerodrome's facilities consisted of an anchored barge to which a floating dock was attached. On the barge there was a small wooden terminal building which also acted as an operations center and control tower. Electric and telephone lines were laid to the barge. Transport to land took place by boat. The airport was only in operation during the summer, typically for

== Bibliography ==
- Reitan, Sverre Utne (2003). Luftfarten på Haugalandet fra 1914 til 2004 (in Norwegian). Karmøy: Eget Forlag.
- Nerdrum, Johan (1986). Fugl fønix: En beretning om Det Norske Luftfartselskap (in Norwegian). Oslo: Gyldendal Norsk Forlag. ISBN 82-05-16663-3.
