= Herdla (island) =

Island in Vestland, Norway

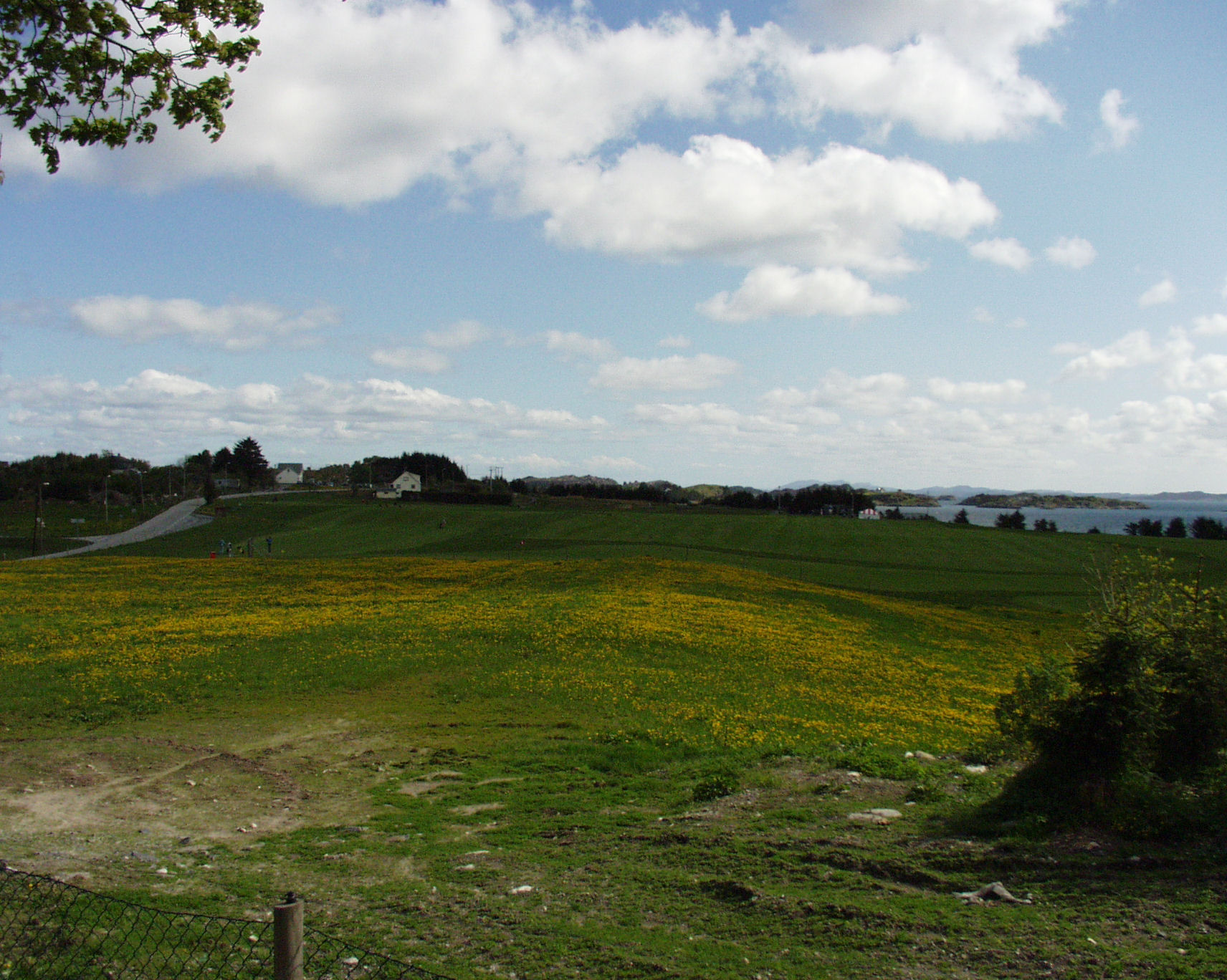
- View of the Herdla Golf Club
- Interactive map of Herdla

Geography
- Location: Vestland, Norway
- Coordinates: 60°34′N 4°57′E
- Area: 1.6 km^{2} (0.62 sq mi)
- Length: 2.2 km (1.37 mi)
- Width: 1.8 km (1.12 mi)

Administration
- Norway
- County: Vestland
- Municipality: Askøy Municipality

Demographics
- Population: 103 (2014)

Herdla is an island in Askøy Municipality in Vestland county, Norway. The 1.6-square-kilometre (0.62 sq mi) island lies just north of the larger island of Askøy and just west of the island of Holsnøy. The island is surrounded by the Herdlefjorden and Hjeltefjorden.

The island of Herdla was part of the old Herdla Municipality until 1 January 1964 when it was merged into Askøy Municipality. The island has a nature reserve with 220 registered species of birds. During the Second World War, it was the site of Herdla Airport and some coastal fortifications. Herdla Church is located on the island.

== Air base and coastal fortifications ==
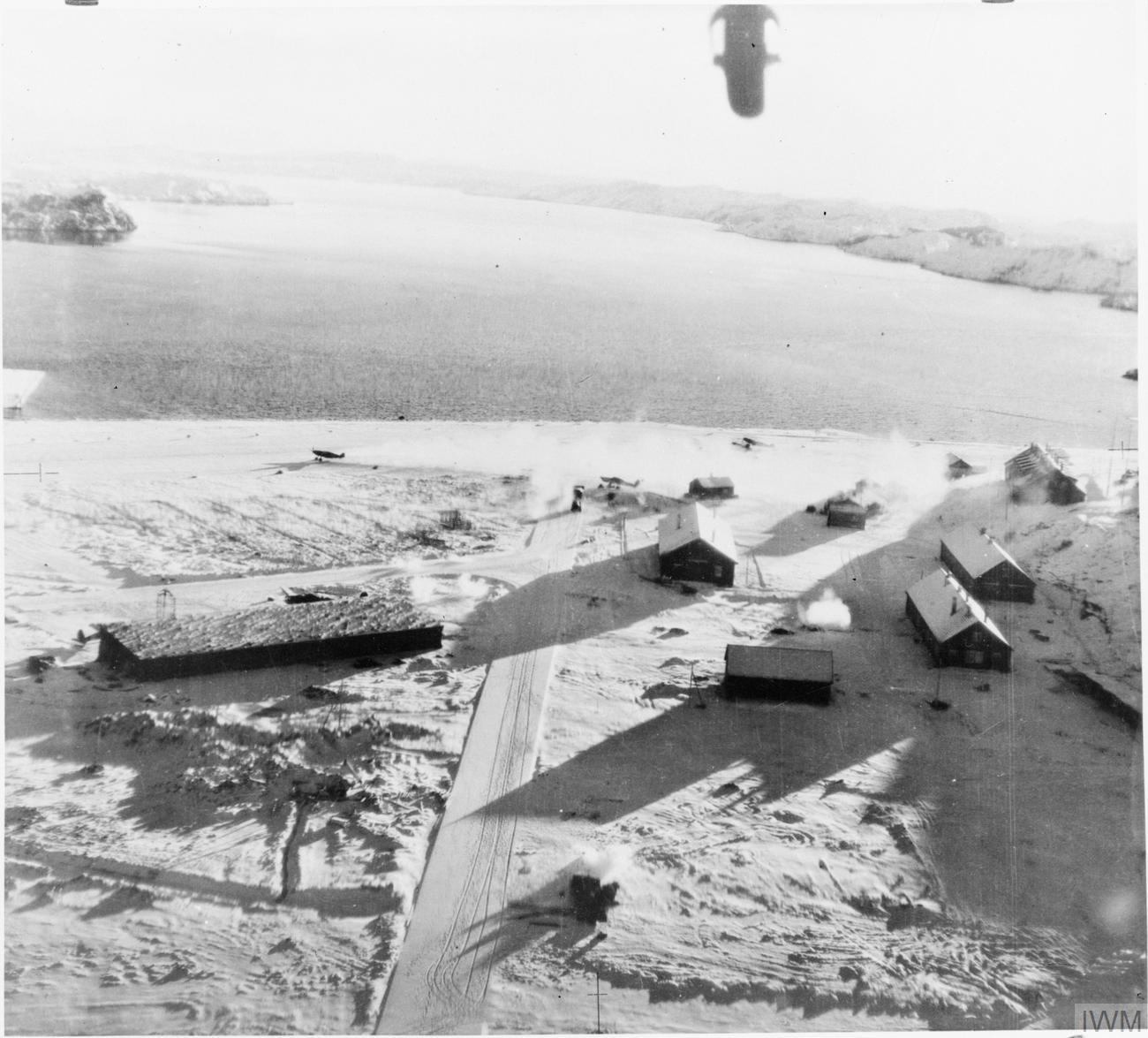
Aircraft from No. 114 Squadron RAF attacking in WWII Herdla Airport in preparation for Operation Archery

During the Second World War, all of Herdla was in effect a military base for the German Luftwaffe. The flat area "Herdlevalen" was considered a good place for an airport. The air base at Herdla was important to defend the west coast of Norway against Allied attacks. Many fortifications were built to hinder possibly invading forces. All civilians had to leave the island. In 1945, they came back to an island full of military installations.

Herdla was seriously considered as the site for Bergen's main airport. After the war the air traffic control for the Bergen area was placed at Herdla. However, in 1955, the airport was finally built at Flesland instead, since that would not require boat to reach it.

After the war some of the military installations were assimilated into the Royal Norwegian Coastal Artillery, which also built a series of new installations on the island. In recent years the fortress had been used for training new recruits for the coastal artillery, but the fortress was permanently closed in 2000 as part of major restructuring of the Norwegian Armed Forces, when the Royal Norwegian Coastal Artillery was decommissioned.

== See also ==
- Black Friday (1945)
- List of islands of Norway
