= West Norway Airlines =

Norwegian airline, 1946–1957

- Founded: 1946
- Ceased operations: 1957
- Operating bases: Bergen Airport, Sandviken
- Headquarters: Bergen, Norway

Vestlandske Luftfartsselskap A/S, trading internationally as West Norway Airlines, was an airline based in Bergen, Norway, which operated from 1946 to 1957. The company operated almost entirely a fleet of seaplanes out of its base at Bergen Airport, Sandviken. From 1951 it operated scheduled services along the West Coast as summer-only services.

The airline started off as a general aviation operator, mostly operating Republic RC-3 Seabees. The airline took over the Bergen to Trondheim route in 1951, at which time it also bought two Short Sealands. The route and intermediate stops in Ålesund, Molde and Kristiansund. The following year the airline also started flying from Stavanger via Haugesund to Bergen. Bergen Airport, Flesland opened in 1955, displacing the need for seaplanes on some of the routes. However, the airline flew the Bergen to Stavanger route with a wheeled de Havilland Heron. The Haugesund service closed in 1956 and the northern route closed the following year in anticipation of the opening of Ålesund Airport, Vigra.

== History ==
The airline was established in Bergen in 1946. The first aircraft were operational in 1948, consisting of three three-passenger Republic RC-3 Seabees and a one-passenger Luscombe 8A Silvaire. The airline was initially engaged in various general aviation activities. An important task was air ambulance services. However, the airline never signed a fixed contract with the health authorities and had to get every trip refunded on a case for case basis form the National Insurance Administration.

The West Coast of Norway had only one land airport during until 1955, Stavanger Airport, Sola. Flights along the coast and to the capital were therefore limited to seaplanes. Norwegian Air Lines resumed its pre–Second World War route from Stavanger via Haugesund Airport, Storesundsskjær to Bergen Airport, Hjellestad in 1946, using Junkers Ju 52 seaplanes. From 1948 they extended the service north from Bergen, calling at Ålesund Airport, Sørneset; Kristiansund and Trondheim Airport, Værnes. The airline pulled out of these routes after the 1949 summer season.

Air ambulance services were carried out between 1947 and 1957, mostly using the Seabees. The busiest period was in 1952 to 1954, when there broke out a polio epidemic and patients needed to be flown to Bergen for isolation and treatment at Haukeland Hospital.

West Norway Airlines took over the Bergen to Trondheim route, which commenced on 14 May 1951. They kept using the former aerodromes, although the re-established Trondheim Airport, Jonsvatnet as a reserve airport for Trondheim. For the 1951 season only, West Norway Airlines operated out of Bergen Airport, Hjellestad. However, after SAS pulled out of the airport after that season, West Norway Airlines chose to retreat back to Sandviken.

The Seabees soon proved to be too small and instead bought an eight-passenger Short Sealands were bought. Widerøe took over the southern portion, but was not able to make money on it and terminated operations after the first summer. West Norway Airlines therefore took over also this segment from 1952. For this a second Sealand was delivered.

With the opening of Bergen Airport, Flesland in 1955, West Norway Airlines commenced a service from Bergen to Stavanger. They bought a land Norsk Flyindustri Finnmark 5A in 1955 for this use, with a capacity for three passengers. It soon proved too small and the following season the airline acquired a new de Havilland Heron aircraft.

The airline was involved in the attempts to establish a regional airport in Florø. Plans were launched in the mid-1950s that an 800-meter (2,600 ft) runway be built which would allow West Norway Airlines to connect to Bergen with a Scottish Aviation Twin Pioneer. The government approved the plans in 1956 and construction of a 400-meter (1,300 ft) runway commenced later that year. However, the authorities deemed the Twin Pioneer unsuitable for winter operations and both these plans and the airport construction fell flat.

Similar plans were launched in Ålesund. Initially Aukra Airport, Gossen was selected as Møre og Romsdal's central airport, but West Norway Airlines instead proposed building a short runway on the island of Vigra and operate to it using the Twin Pioneer. Although West Norway Airlines would never receive concessions to operate land planes from Ålesund, the site was ultimately selected for Ålesund Airport, Vigra, when opened in 1958.

The route to Haguesund continued until 29 September 1956. From then the local authorities stated that they would rather than the subsidies be used to build a land airport than retain sea services. Braathens SAFE was selected as the operator of the coastal routes from Ålesund instead of West Norway Airlines. Following the icing incident leading to the crash of Braathens SAFE Flight 253 in 1956, the aviation authorities banned winter operations of the Herons. Thus newer aircraft were needed. Braathens SAFE offered to cross-subsidize the coastal route Bergen–Ålesund–Trondheim in exchange for receiving a monopoly on the profitable Oslo route. Left without concessions, the airline filed for bankruptcy at the end of the 1957 season.

== Destinations ==
The following is a list of scheduled destination served by West Norway Airlines.

West Norway Airlines destinations
Location	Airport	Period	Ref(s)
Ålesund	Ålesund Airport, Sørneset	1951–57	
Bergen	Bergen Airport, Flesland	1955–57	
Bergen	Bergen Airport, Hjellestad	1951	
Bergen	Bergen Airport, Sandviken	1951–57	
Haugesund	Haugesund Airport, Storesundsskjær	1952–56	
Kristiansund	?	1951–57	
Molde	?	1951–57	
Trondheim	Trondheim Airport, Værnes	1951–57	
Trondheim	Trondheim Airport, Jonsvatnet	1951–57	
Stavanger	Stavanger Airport, Sola	1952–57	

== Fleet ==
The following aircraft were operated by West Norway Airlines:

West Norway Airlines aircraft
Model	Qty	Built	First in	Last out	Ref(s)
Luscombe 8A Silvaire	2	1947	1948	1952	
Republic RC-3 Seabee	5	1947	1948	1957	
Supermarine Walrus	1	1938–42	1949	1954	
Short Sealand	2	1950	1951	1957	
Aeronca K Scout	1	1937	1952	1952	
Norsk Flyindustri Finnmark 5A	1	1949	1955	1958	
de Havilland Heron	1	1956	1956	1958	
Piper J-3 Cub	1	1944	1956	1957	

== Bibliography ==
- Aarsand, Knut; Bakka, Dag. "Hjellestad sjøflyhavn 1948–1952". Årsskrift 2004–2005 (in Norwegian). Fana Historielag. pp. 38–42. ISSN 0809-5256.
- Hjelle, Bjørn Owe (2007). Ålesund lufthavn Vigra (in Norwegian). Valderøya. ISBN 978-82-92055-28-1.
- Hagby, Kay (1998). Fra Nielsen & Winther til Boeing 747 (in Norwegian). Drammen: Hagby. ISBN 8299475201.
- Olsen-Hagen, Bernt; Gulstad, Anne Blix; Gynnild, Olav (2010). Kristiansund lufthavn, Kvernberget – Dokumentasjon for arkivmessig bevaring (PDF) (in Norwegian). Norwegian Aviation Museum. Archived (PDF) from the original on 15 January 2015.
- Østerbø, Kjell (2005). Da Bergen tok av (in Norwegian). Avinor. ISBN 82-303-0495-5.
- Reitan, Sverre Utne (2003). Luftfarten på Haugalandet fra 1914 til 2004 (in Norwegian). Karmøy: Eget Forlag.
- Tjomsland, Audun; Wilsberg, Kjell (1995). Braathens SAFE 50 år: Mot alle odds. Oslo. ISBN 82-990400-1-9.
- Vik, Knut L. (2003). "Trondheim lufthavn Jonsvatnet 1935–1939" (PDF). Strinda den gang da (in Norwegian). Trondheim: Strinda historielag. pp. 85–107. ISBN 82-92357-02-5. ISSN 1502-2315. Archived from the original (PDF) on 18 December 2013.
