= Norsk Flyindustri Finnmark 5A =

Amphibious airliner

Finnmark 5A
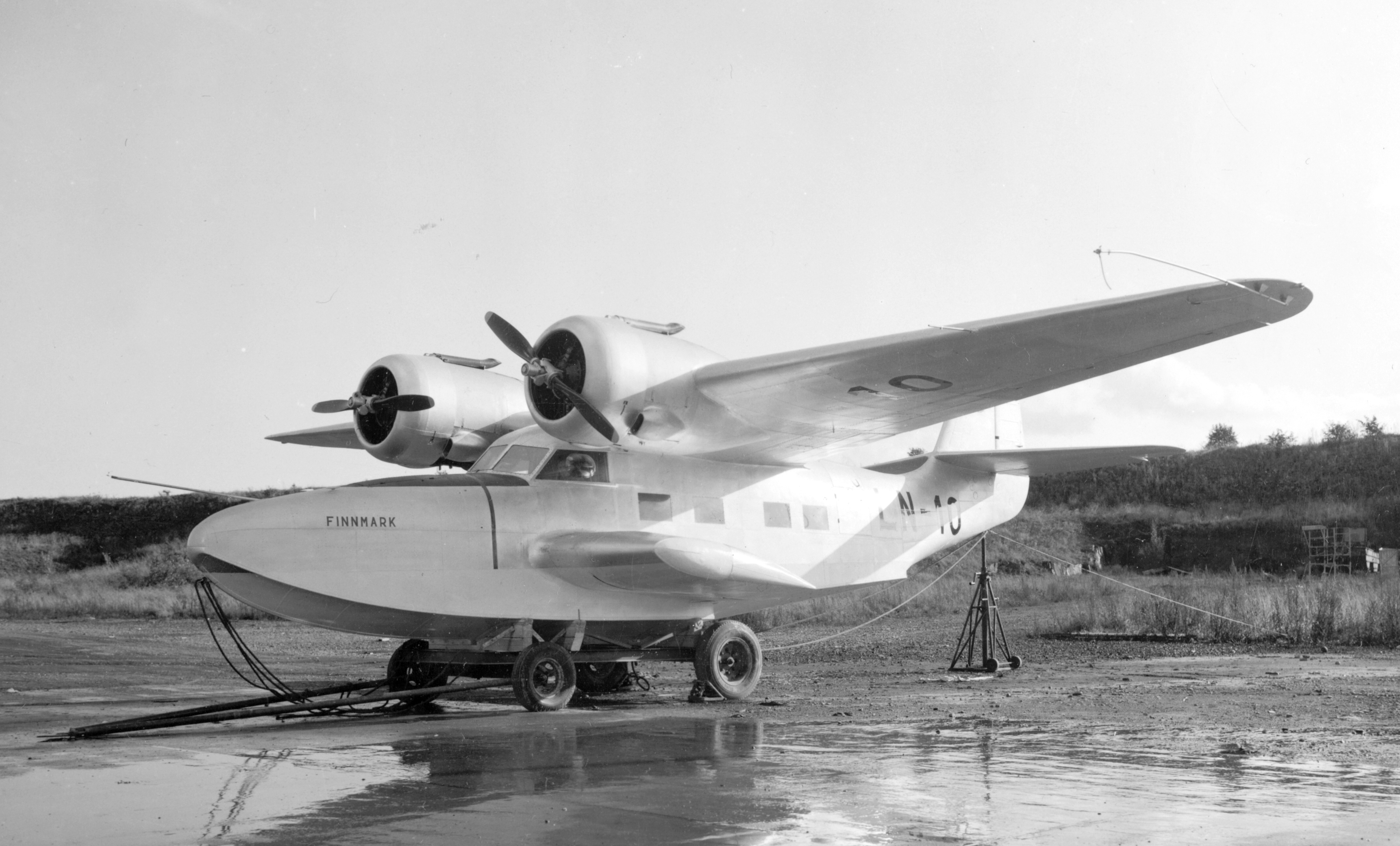
- Finnmark 5A

General information
- Type: Amphibious airliner
- National origin: Norway
- Manufacturer: Norsk Flyindustri
- Designer: Birger Hønningstad
- Status: Scrapped
- Primary users: VLS Norrønafly
- Number built: 1

History
- First flight: September 1949

The Norsk Flyindustri Finnmark 5A (named for the Norwegian county) was an amphibious flying-boat airliner built in Norway in the late 1940s. The single prototype was operated by the VLS airline, but no orders for additional aircraft were received, and a refined version designated 5A-II was never built. The Finnmark was a conventional high-wing cantilever monoplane with twin engines housed in nacelles on the wings, and the first twin-engined aircraft constructed in Norway. A specially designed combination wheel-ski undercarriage retracted into wide sponsons on the sides of the flying boat hull.

This undercarriage (built by Dowty in England) was the subject of patents in Norway, Sweden, and Canada, and was constructed in such a way that the skis would be properly aligned for retraction and extension, and while lowered in flight, but would be free to move under landing forces, pivoting and deflecting to facilitate a smooth landing on rough snow or ice.

The prototype Finnmark made its first flight on 17 September 1949, as a pure flying boat, being fitted with its retractable undercarriage in the winter of 1951–52. Before 1954, it was modified by removing its undercarriage, and replacing the sponsons by wing-mounted stabilising floats. It entered service with Vestlandske Luftfartsselskap that year, flying a service between Bergen, Haugesund and Stavanger. It was later sold to Norrønafly. The airworthiness certificate expired in 1961, and the aircraft was scrapped in 1965.

Only one of the Cowlings avoided scrapping and is on display at the Norwegian Aviation Museum in Bodø.

== Specifications (5A-II, as designed) ==
Data from Hönningstad Finnmark Amphibian

General characteristics

- Crew: Two
- Capacity: 12 passengers
- Length: 14.12 m (46 ft 4 in)
- Wingspan: 19.05 m (62 ft 6 in)
- Wing area: 48.5 m^{2} (522 sq ft)
- Empty weight: 4,530 kg (9,966 lb)
- Gross weight: 5,950 kg (13,100 lb)
- Powerplant: 2 × Pratt & Whitney R-1340-S1H1 , 450 kW (600 hp) each

Performance

- Maximum speed: 300 km/h (190 mph, 170 kn)
- Cruise speed: 250 km/h (156 mph, 136 kn)
- Rate of climb: 5.6 m/s (1,100 ft/min)
