= Artur von Casimir =

German World War II pilot (1908-2005)

- Born: 4 September 1908
- Died: 15 December 2005 (aged 97)
- Military career
- Allegiance: Nazi Germany
- Branch: Luftwaffe
- Commands: Kampfgruppe 100
- Conflicts: Operation Weserübung

Artur von Casimir (4 September 1908 - 15 December 2005) was a German Oberst and former bomber pilot who flew for the Luftwaffe during World War II. Since 2004 he has received a great deal of publicity in Norway. One of the Heinkel He 111 he flew was recovered from Jonsvatnet lake near Trondheim in 2004, where it had been submerged since falling through the ice during the spring thaw in April 1940. He commanded Kampfgruppe 100 during the German invasion of Norway, and led the air raids on Namsos on 20 April 1940 (See Namsos Campaign). He assumed the position of Gruppenkommandeur over KGr. 100 on 16 February 1940.

Artur von Casimir at the controls of a Heinkel He 111

Von Casimir was shot down by two Hawker Hurricane fighters from the British No. 46 Squadron RAF during an attack on Skånland in Troms on 29 May 1940. He made an emergency landing at Ulsvåg in Nordland and was captured. Von Casimir was first held as a prisoner of war by the Norwegians, before being transferred to British custody.

== Bibliography ==
- Guhnfeldt, Cato (1990). Fornebu 9. april (in Norwegian). Oslo: Wings. ISBN 82-992194-1-8.
