= Birger Hønningstad =

Norwegian engineer and aircraft designer

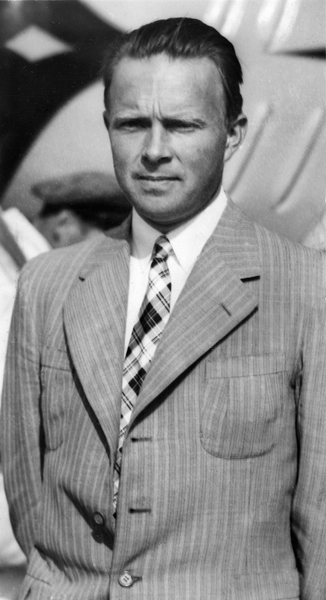
Birger Hønningstad, c. 1938

Birger Hønningstad (17 September 1904 – 2 April 1976) was a Norwegian engineer and aircraft designer.

== Biography ==
Hønningstad was born in Ås, Akershus, Norway. He was the son of Amund Bertelsen Hønningstad (1875-1944) and Grethe Olsen Sagesund (1874-1953).He attended the Norwegian Institute of Technology in Trondheim with continued studies at the University of Detroit, graduating in 1931. In 1933, Hønningstad started his own engineering company in Oslo. From 1937, he was also a theoretical teacher at Viggo Widerøe Airline School at Bogstad.

Hønningstad constructed several airplanes, first in his own engineering firm, Birger Hønningstad & Co, and after World War II at Norsk Flyindustri, where he was director and chairman. Hønningstad's initiative, together with shipowner Ole Bergesen, resulted in the establishment of an airport in the Stavanger area of Norway. It was opened in 1937 as Norway's first civil airport by King Haakon VII.

== Aircraft constructed ==
- Hønningstad Norge A (1938)
- Hønningstad C-5 Polar (1939) prototype
- Hønningstad Norge B (1946)
- Widerøe Polar (1948)
- Norsk Flyindustri Finnmark 5A (1949)
- Hønningstad Norge C (1960)
