= Widerøe Polar =

Norwegian general-purpose monoplane

C.5 Polar
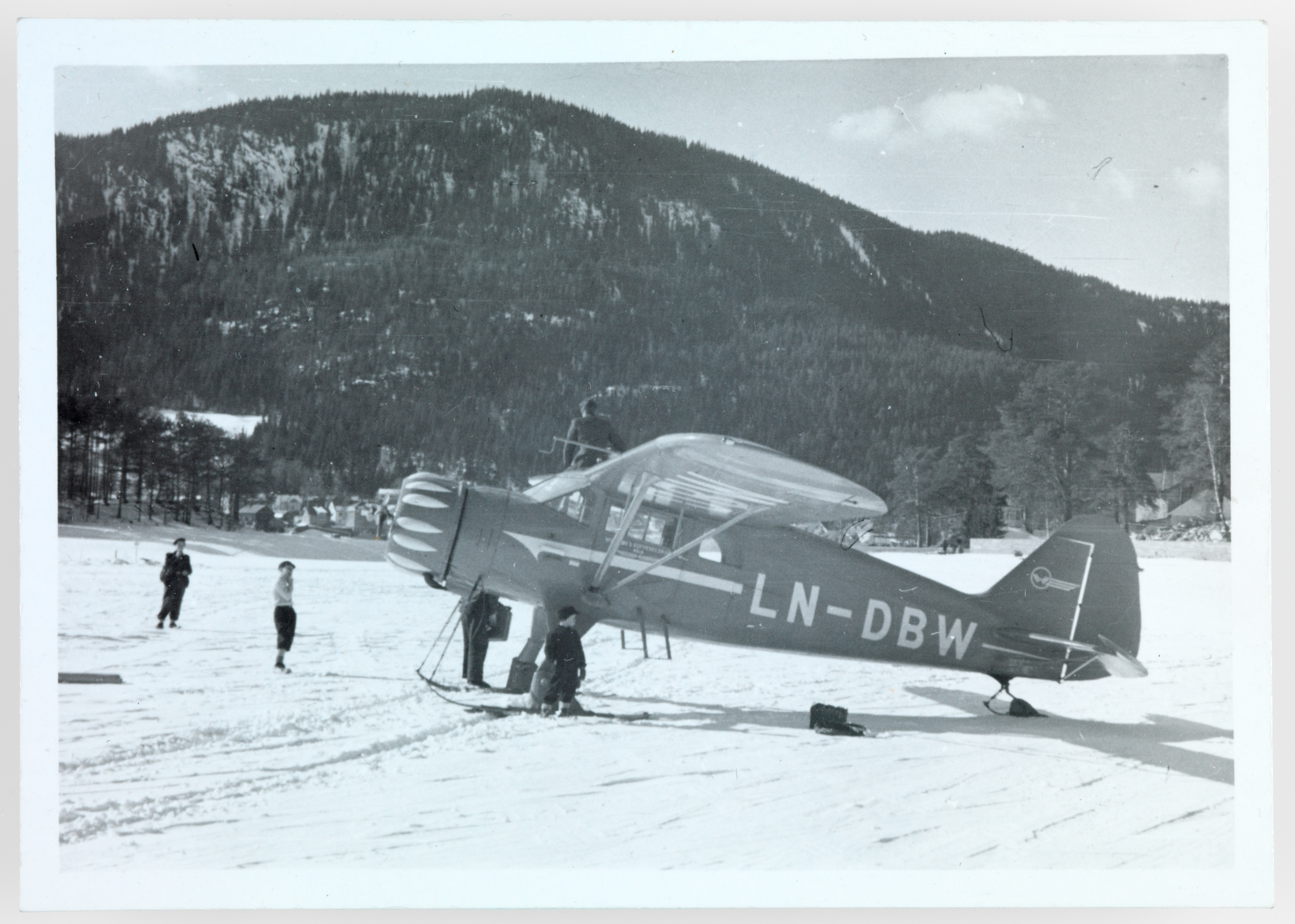

General information
- Type: General-purpose monoplane
- Manufacturer: Widerøes Flyveselskap
- Designer: Birger Hønningstad
- Primary user: Widerøes Flyveselskap

History
- Introduction date: 1948
- First flight: 1948

The Widerøe C.5 Polar, sometimes known as the Honningstad C.5 Polar, was a Norwegian general-purpose land or floatplane built by Widerøes Flyveselskap.

== Design and development ==
The Norwegian airline Widerøe decided in the late 1940s to design and build a general-purpose aircraft for its own use. Built in the airline's workshops, the Widerøe C.5 Polar was a braced high-wing monoplane which could be operated on floats, skis, or wheels. It had an enclosed cabin for a pilot and up to five passengers, and the passenger seats were removable to enable the aircraft to be used for freight or as an air ambulance. The first C.5 Polar was built and flown in 1948.

== Operational history ==
A small number of aircraft entered service with the Widerøes Flyveselskap airline.

== Operators ==
Norway

- Widerøes Flyveselskap

== Specifications (Polar landplane) ==
Data from Jane's All The World's Aircraft 1951–52

General characteristics

- Crew: 1
- Capacity: 5 passengers
- Length: 8.99 m (29 ft 6 in)
- Wingspan: 13.72 m (45 ft 0 in)
- Height: 2.54 m (8 ft 4 in)
- Wing area: 25 m^{2} (270 sq ft)
- Airfoil: NACA 23012
- Empty weight: 1,362 kg (3,003 lb)
- Gross weight: 2,072 kg (4,568 lb)
- Fuel capacity: 400 L (110 US gal; 88 imp gal)
- Powerplant: 1 × Pratt & Whitney R-985 Wasp Junior 9-cylinder radial engine, 340 kW (450 hp)

Performance

- Maximum speed: 232 km/h (144 mph, 125 kn)
- Cruise speed: 210 km/h (130 mph, 110 kn)
- Range: 1,056 km (656 mi, 570 nmi)
- Service ceiling: 5,490 m (18,010 ft)
- Rate of climb: 6.1 m/s (1,200 ft/min)
