= Herdla Airport =

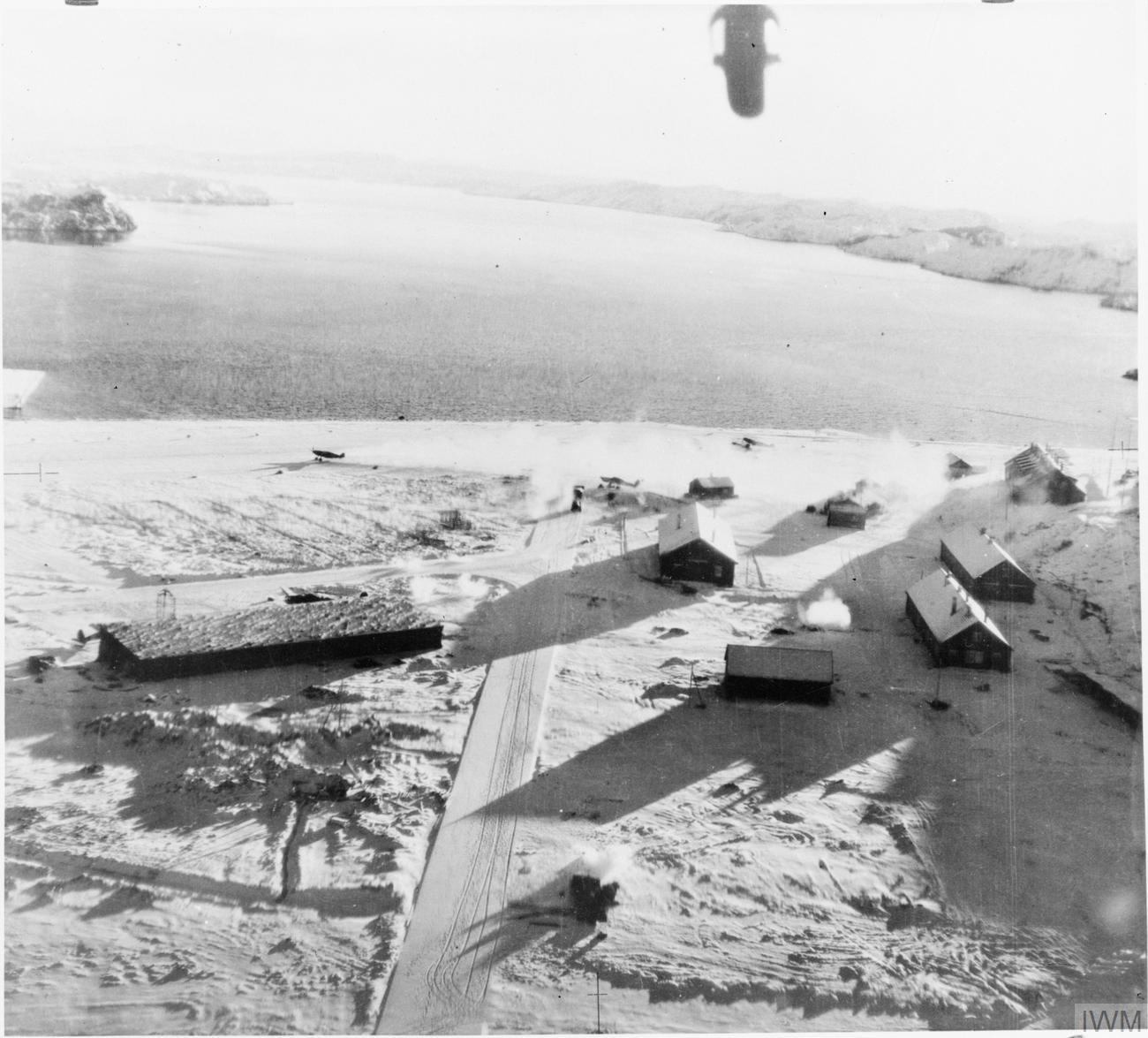
- The airport under attack during Operation Archery in 1941
- IATA: none; ICAO: none

Summary
- Serves: Bergen, Norway
- Coordinates: 60.576°N 004.957°E

Map

Runways
Direction	Length		Surface
Direction	m	ft	Surface
	850	2,790	Wood
	1,000	3,280	Wood

Herdla Airport (Norwegian: Herdla flyplass; German: Flugplatz Herdla) was a military air base situated on the island of Herdla in Askøy Municipality, Norway. It consisted of two wooden runways, 1,000 and 850 meters (3,280 and 2,790 ft) long, respectively, in addition to wharfs for a water aerodrome.

Herdla was originally proposed during the 1930s as the site of the main airport for Bergen. With the German occupation of Norway, the island was seized by the German Luftwaffe. Construction started in June 1940 and the first runway opened in October. The second was completed the following year. Throughout the Second World War the airport served fighter aircraft; these were used to attack the Arctic convoys, defend German vessels from Royal Air Force raids, as well as provide an airborne defense against British bomber missions against Laksevåg.

The airport was taken over by the Royal Norwegian Air Force in 1945. They retained operations until 1948 and in 1955 Bergen Airport, Flesland opened as Bergen's main airport. Herdla remained in cursory civil and military use until 1972.

== History ==
=== Civil airport proposals ===
Bergen had been served by the military Bergen Airport, Flatøy since the 1920s and from 1934 Bergen Airport, Sandviken, both water aerodromes. Following the establishment of Gressholmen Airport in Oslo in 1927, Parliament appointed a state committee in 1930 to consider suitable locations for the construction of more airports. Bergen was one of the cities for which an airport was considered. Bergen Municipal Council appointed a committee in 1933 to find a suitable location. The committee looked for suitable sites for a land airport, and considered both Flesland and Herdla as suitable sites.

The main concern with Herdla was the lack of a road access and the necessity of crossing both Herdlesundet and Byfjorden. Vest-Norges Flyveselskap proposed shuttling people to the city by seaplane; others proposed a ferry service. Bergen Municipal Council approved that technical plans be made on 9 February 1938. This resulted in a report in published on 15 December, which recommended an airport with three runways, two 1,000 meters (3,300 ft) long and one 800 meters (2,600 ft). All were to be 40 meters (130 ft) wide. However, lack of funding caused the plans to be placed on hold. However, a radio beacon was built at Herdla in 1938 to aid the coastal service provided by Norwegian Air Lines. In 1939 enthusiasts brought a sailplane to Herdla in an attempt to use it for flight, but were hindered by strong winds. On 1 September that year a Fairey Swordfish of the Royal Air Force (RAF) failed to find Herdla to conduct an emergency landing, instead landing in the Sognefjord.

=== Construction ===
Germany invaded Norway on 9 April 1940, quickly securing control over Bergen and its vicinity. Two RAF squadrons of Blackburn Skuas flew from RNAS Hatston on Orkney the following day, successfully sinking the German cruiser Königsberg in Bergen. This was the first sinking of a major warship in the Second World War by aircraft. Admiral Otto von Schrader was concerned about the lack of German air support in the area. His only option was using Sola Air Station outside Stavanger, which provided insufficient response times.

The Kriegsmarine considered four suitable sites: Herdla, Flesland, the disused harness racing track at Nesttun and Haukåsmyrene in Åsane Municipality. They visited Herdla on 3 May 1940, but concluded that it was not suitable. Major earthworks would need to be carried out and the two-and-a-half-hour-long boat ride was prohibitive. However, on 12 May a German Heinkel He 111 bomber heading to Sola landed on the fields on Herdla after it had run into difficulties. This convinced the Luftwaffe of the suitability of the location.

Construction began in June 1940 by Organisation Todt's Einsatzgruppe Wiking. The first work was on Runway I, the northernmost. Work was carried out hastily and this resulted in poor ground conditions. An operational runway was completed by August. The people living in the vicinity were evacuated and the buildings transformed into offices and workshops for the Luftwaffe. A major effort to camouflage the facility took place in September, after which work on the north–south runway commenced. It received more thorough work and proper draining and was built to a dimension of 1,000 by 50 meters (3,280 by 160 ft). This work lasted through 1941.

=== Military operations ===
The first aircraft stationed at Herdla was a flight of four Messerschmitt Bf 109 of Jagdgeschwader 4 (JG 4), named Bereitschaftsschwarm Herdle. The coast of Western Norway was within range of RAF raids and therefore any ships running along the coast would be in need of air support. Herdla was initially a difficult airport to operate out of in part due to the short runway. Commands were often issued too late for an adequate response time. The Bf 109 were withdrawn to take part in the Battle of Britain in November and replaced by Zerstörergeschwader 76 (ZG 76) which operated larger Messerschmitt Bf 110. The number of aircraft increased to five in January 1941. They were regularly shot down or damaged beyond repair and Herdla, therefore, received a steady stream of new aircraft, either Bf 109s or Bf 110s.

By January 1941 there were 430 Norwegians working on constructing the airport, later that year increasing to nearly the double. These supplemented a significant number of German workers. The disused corvette Nordstjernen was anchored up and used for housing for Norwegian workers. The runways and tarmac were made of 2-by-2-meter (6 ft 7 in by 6 ft 7 in) wooden frames manufactured in Arna and sent by ship.

The island of Herdla also had a village and the municipal center of Herdla Municipality. As work on the airport progressed, more and more of the local residents were forced to relocate. A barbed wire was placed across the island in March 1941, dividing it into a military and civilian sector. But soon the rest of population, including the municipal administration, was forced to relocate, totaling 108 people.

Most of the skirmishes were against the RAF Coastal Command and mostly saw combat with Bristol Beaufort, Bristol Blenheim and Lockheed Hudson aircraft. In April 1941 ZG 76 was pulled out and replaced with JG 77. In the course of 1941 the number of air defense personnel increased from 90 to 180. By late 1941 nine Messerschmitts fighters, a Heinkel He 111 bomber and some trainers were based at the airport. Supplies were provided three times a week using a Junkers Ju 52. Work on the taxiways commenced during the fall of 1941. By the end of the year about one thousand people were working at the airport.

Herdla was raided by the No. 114 Squadron RAF as part of Operation Archery on 27 December 1941. In addition to severe damage to the infrastructure, one Messerschmitt was destroyed during take-off. Herdla was again bombed by the RAF on 7 January 1942, although without the aircraft hitting their targets. All Bf 109Ts were replaced with Bf 109Es in January 1942. Herdla became part of JG 5 when it was established in January 1942. This was followed up with dispatching several Kriegsmarine ships to Northern Norway, including the battleship Tirpitz, to counteract the Arctic convoys, creating a buzz of activity for Herdla.

Eastern European prisoners of war started to participate in the construction work from 1942. Meanwhile, the Bf 109Es were replaced with the improved Bf 109F series. In July Luftwaffe instead decided to station the new Focke-Wulf Fw 190 at Herdla, replacing the Messerschmitts. By 7 August there were twelve Focke-Wulfs operating out of Herdla. In December the operations center burned down after a pilot, drunk from attending a party, took off and crashed. Herdla remained the only airport between Sola and Trøndelag until July 1943, when Gossen Airport opened. Thereafter they took over most of the operations north of Stad.

On 24 July 1943 a major raid with 84 United States Army Air Forces aircraft bombed the U-boat pens at Laksevåg. Thirty-five aircraft from Herdla were dispatched to defend the site. Within a month JG 5 was transferred to Denmark.

By 1943 the Allied threat towards German convoys in Norway had shifted. While previously naval attacks were the largest concern, air attacks became more prevalent. Convoys therefore increasingly operated at night, often hugging the fjords during the daytime where the landscape made tactical bombing difficult. The short range of the Herdla-based aircraft was a challenge for the Luftwaffe, who in January 1944 therefore decided to again station Bf 110s at Herdla. As of May 1944 the aircraft stationed at Herdla were six Bf 110, three Fieseler Storch, one Focke-Wulf Fw 58 and a Junkers W 34.

A major bombing raid towards Laksevåg was carried out by 140 Avro Lancaster and Handley Page Halifax bombers on 4 October 1944. The fighters at Herdla were dispatched and intercepted the bombers over Sotra. They avoided engagement over Bergen to avoid interfering with the air defenses. This was repeated on 29 October with 244 bombers. From December Bf 109s returned to Herdla. The number of skirmishes between British and German forces along the West Coast increased in this period, and the Luftwaffe concentrated its aircraft matériel in Norway to said area. Another bomber raid against Lakevåg took place on 12 January 1945.

=== Peacetime and closing ===
At the time of the end of World War II in Europe on 8 May 1945, there were twenty-one Fw A-8s, one Bf 110 and two or three Storchs at Herdla. The German troops organized their own evacuation, which went via Voss Municipality. On 20 May a B-24 Liberator carried out an emergency landing at Herdla while en route to Trondheim. They discovered that by then Allied troops had yet to secure control over the airport. Soon about twenty Norwegians were dispatched to secure the airport. Due to the short runway, the Liberator was unable to take off and was scrapped at Herdla.

The Royal Norwegian Air Force took control over the airport and stationed ex-German Storchs there until late 1946. The civilian population was allowed to return to the island in October 1945. However, most of the buildings were worn down and damaged. The island had to be cleared of mines, and for a long period it was uncertain if the entire area had been cleared. This limited the area which could be used. Most of the wooden runway cover were removed and used as building materials.

After the end of the war the discussion about building an airport for Bergen reappeared. Herdla was a natural choice, given the amount of investments which had been made. Air Command West proposed on 8 March 1946 that two runways be built, one north–south measuring 1,050 by 45 meters (3,445 by 148 ft), with the possibility of being extended to 1,500 meters (4,900 ft). The east–west runway was proposed to be 850 by 45 meters (2,789 by 148 ft), with possibilities for an extension to 1,200 meters (3,900 ft). Both were to receive concrete surfaces. The control tower was rebuilt and the air force stationed an air traffic controller from July 1946. Bergen Municipality was sufficiently convinced of Herdla's suitability that they bought fast ferries to operate a shuttle service.

The Ministry of Transport and Communications, Norwegian Air Lines and other authorities inspected Herdla on 7 January 1947. They agreed that Herdla was suitable both as a land and seaplane base. However, there was a major rationing of concrete and the authorities instead decided Stavanger Airport, Sola would for the meantime be the sole land-based airport in Western Norway. All air routes along the coast would therefore for the meantime be served using seaplanes. Sandviken was at the time used for routes, but was replaced by a new water aerodrome, Bergen Airport, Hjellestad, on 23 August 1948. At the same time the tower service at Herdla was closed.

Bergen Aero Klubb (BAK) struck a deal with the air force to use the airport from 1950. They leased a hangar and used it to store their Piper Cub. From 1952 they were joined by Os Aero Klubb. The two clubs remained active at Herdla until 1954, after which the activity dwindled.

Engineering reports were made of both Herdla and Flesland in 1950 and 1951. Previous investigations of Flesland had concluded that the length of the runway was limited to a small valley which is located at about the middle of the current runway. The new report proposed connecting the proposed area to a larger area to the south of the valley, which was at the right elevation. This would allow for a 3,000-meter (9,800 ft) long runway. A political concern was the high cost of constructing a new airport. By 1950 land airports had been built for Oslo, Stavanger, Trondheim and Kristiansand. This was supplemented with SAS deciding to terminate the services to Oslo and instead provide a feeder service to Stavanger.

Alternatives were launched by two competing airlines: Braathens SAFE proposed a minor upgrade to Herdla which would allow them to operate with their de Havilland Heron aircraft. Widerøe on their side proposed using their Consolidated PBY Catalina flying boats, but these proved too expensive. At the same time, the Royal Norwegian Air Force started looking at Flesland as a suitable air station. Military engineers surveyed the area and concluded that it was well-suited for military purposes. The North Atlantic Treaty Organization (NATO) granted funding for seven air stations in Norway in 1952, but these did not include Flesland. By then both military and ground transport concerns had made Flesland a favorite and funding was secured in 1952. Bergen Airport, Flesland opened on 2 October 1955.

Herdla Airport remained operational as a private airport, but saw very little use. During the 1960s it experienced a rise in traffic. A major military exercise took place in 1973 with forty civilian aircraft used. After that the airport was closed. The area was then used as agricultural land, although it remains owned by the military. Part of airport area has become a nature reserve.

== Facilities ==
Herdla Airport took up most of the island of Herdla. It consisted of two runways. The first, designated I, ran roughly east–west and was 850 meters (2,790 ft) long. The second, designated II, ran roughly north–south and measured 1,000 by 50 meters (3,280 by 160 ft). The latter was lit, allowing it to be used at night. Both had a mix of wood, concrete and grass surface. These were supplemented by a series of taxiways and two large hangars. The airport had an air defense system supported with two Würzburg Riese radars.

== Bibliography ==
- Fossen, Anders Bjarne (2008). Sagaen om Herdla gård (in Norwegian). ISBN 978-82-991949-4-5.
- Østerbø, Kjell (2005). Da Bergen tok av (in Norwegian). Avinor. ISBN 82-303-0495-5.
- Sælensminde, Ole Bjørn (2001). Herdla fra fredelig bygd til krigsskuleplass (in Norwegian). Askøy: Askøy Municipality. ISBN 82-7128-236-0.
- Skorpen, Lars (1996). Ein flygeidé – OAK 50 år (in Norwegian). Askøy: Os Aero Klubb.
