= Jonsvatnet =

Lake in Trondheim, Norway

- Interactive map of the lake
- Location: Trondheim Municipality, Trøndelag
- Coordinates: 63.3655°N 10.5820°E
- Primary outflows: Vikelva
- Basin countries: Norway
- Max. length: 8 kilometres (5.0 mi)
- Max. width: 4.5 kilometres (2.8 mi)
- Surface area: 14.26 km^{2} (5.51 sq mi)
- Shore length^{1}: 43.64 kilometres (27.12 mi)
- Surface elevation: 148 metres (486 ft)
- References: NVE
- ^{1} Shore length is not a well-defined measure.

Jonsvatnet is a lake in Trøndelag county, Norway. Most of the lake is in the eastern part of Trondheim Municipality, with a very small part of the shoreline belonging to Malvik Municipality. The lake is the main source for drinking water for the city of Trondheim.

== Media gallery ==
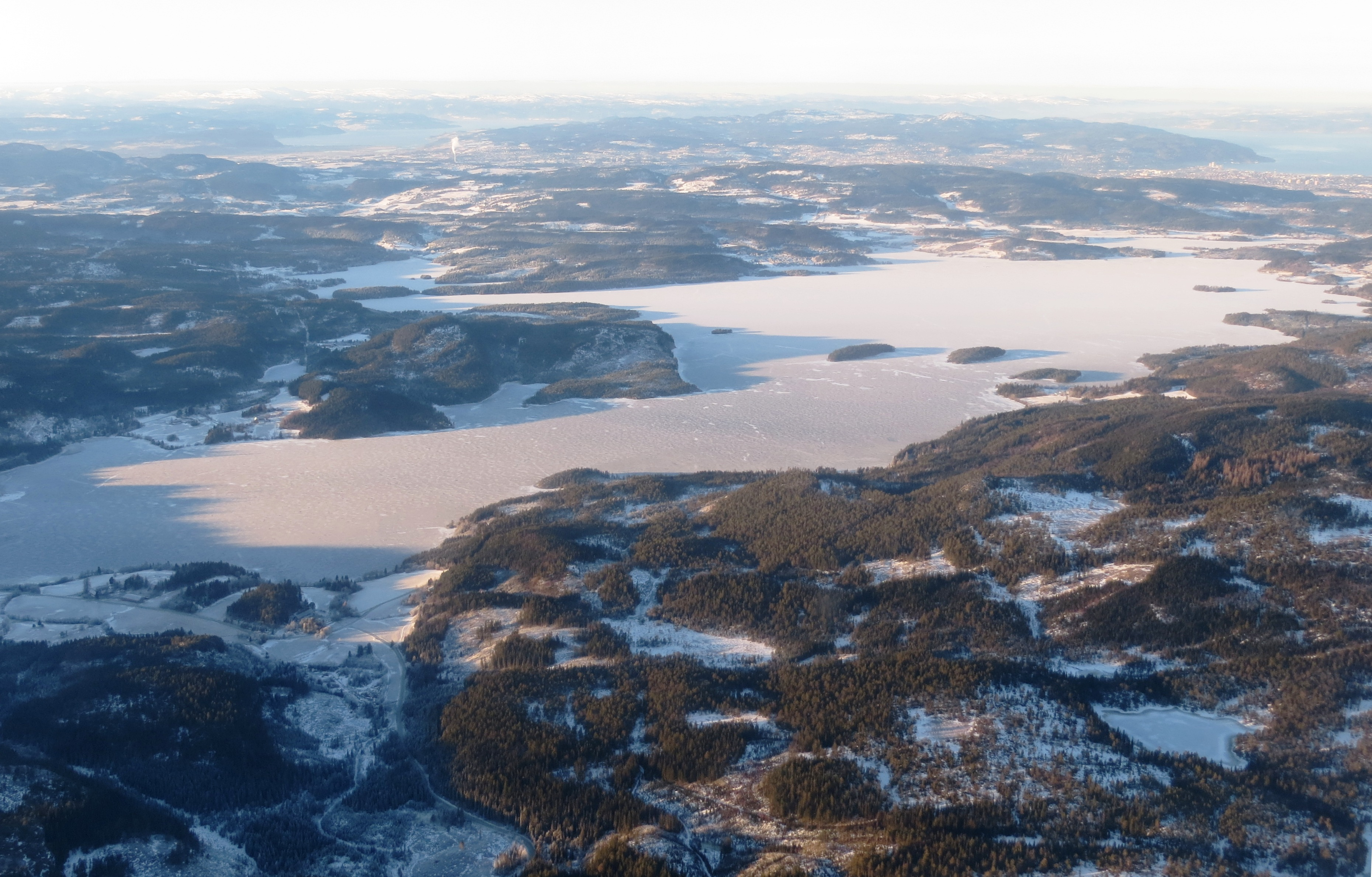
View of the frozen lake in winter

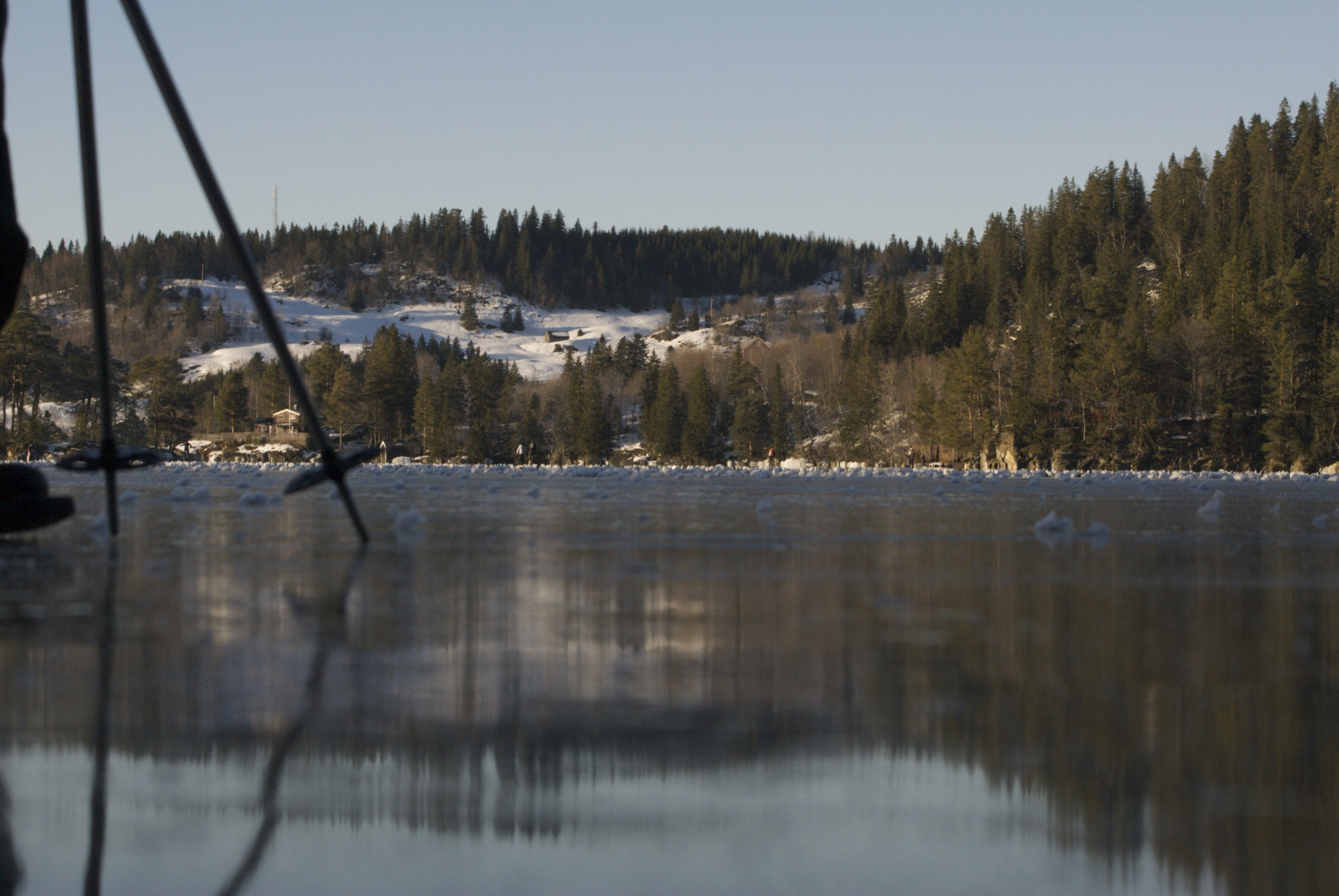
View of the lake (Feb 2009)

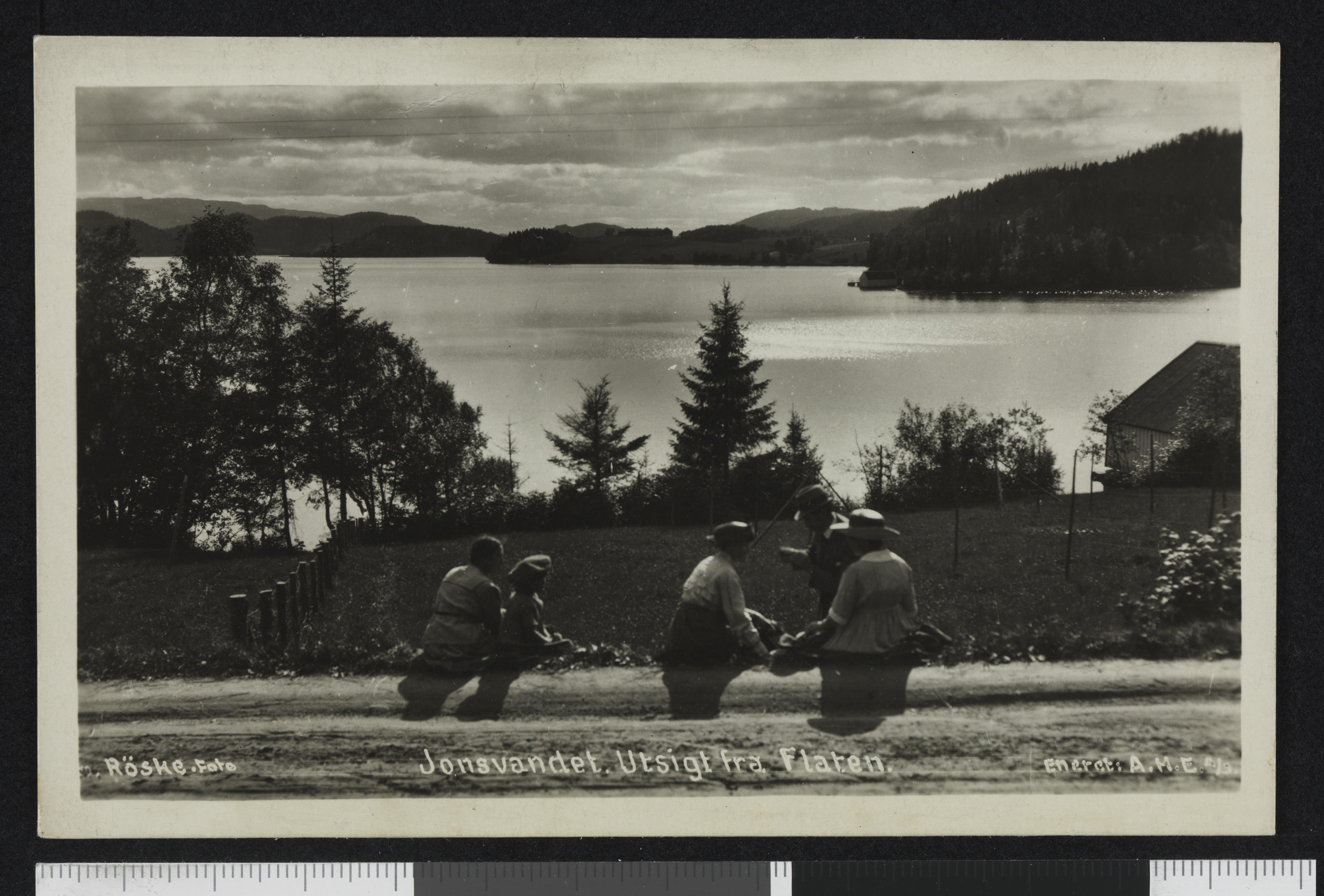
Summer at the lake (c. 1915)

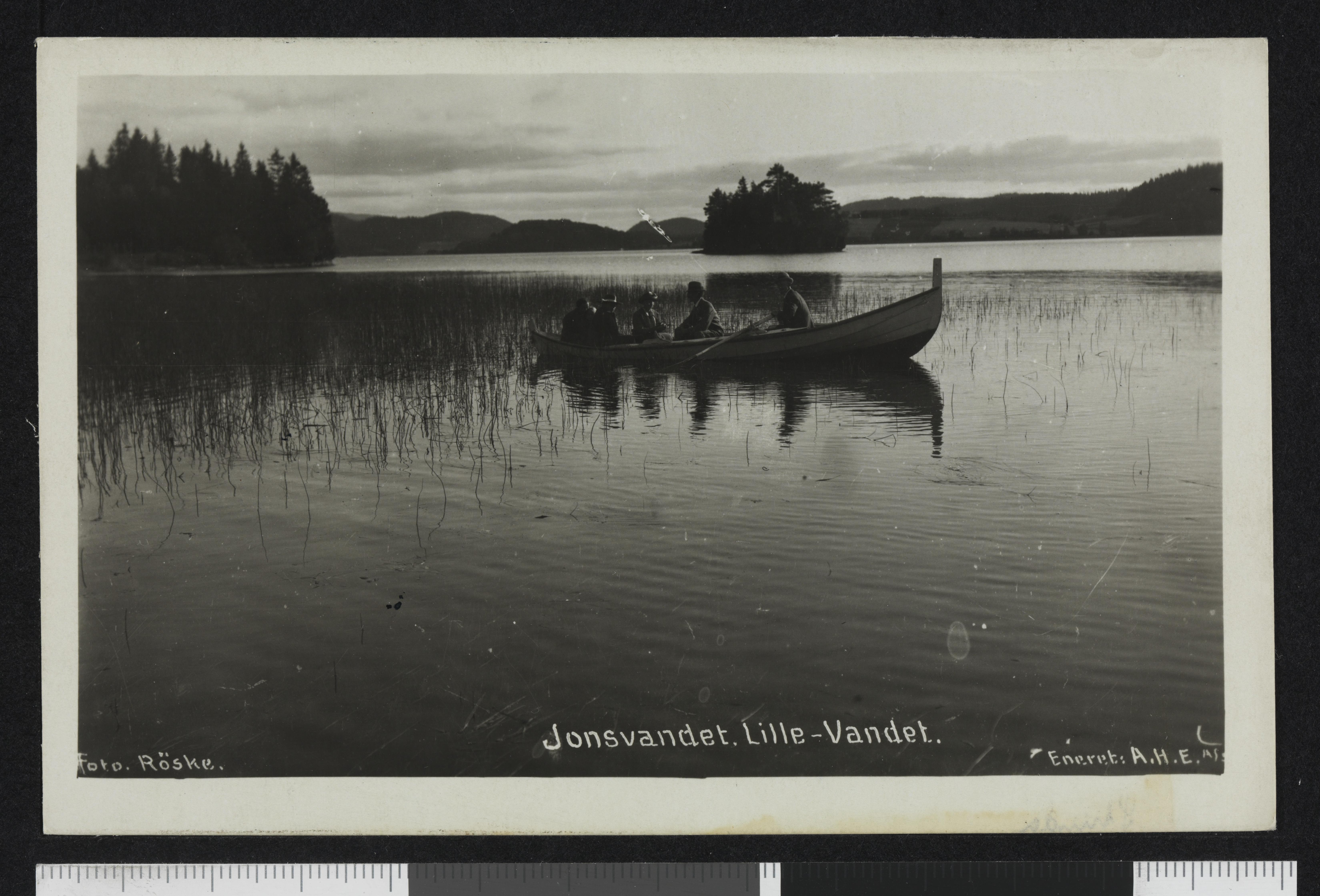
Summer at the lake (c. 1915)

== See also ==
- List of lakes in Norway
