= Short Sealand =

British-built light commercial amphibious aircraft

Sealand
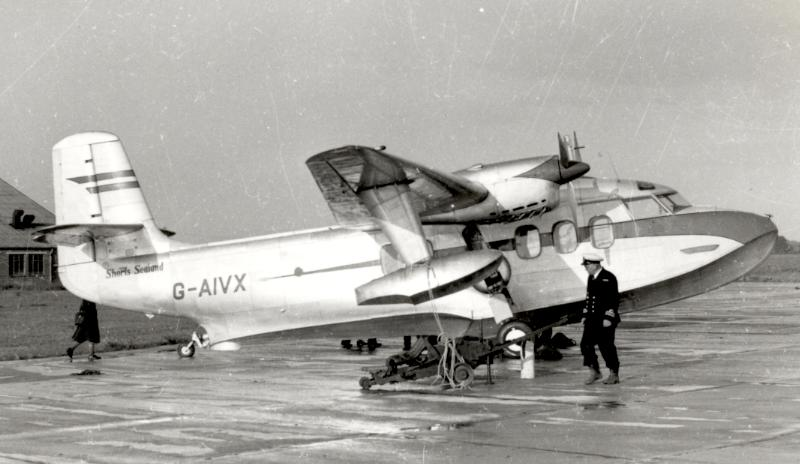
- Short Sealand prototype and demonstrator G-AIVX at RNAS Stretton on 25 July 1953

General information
- Type: Amphibious flying boat
- Manufacturer: Short Brothers
- Designer: C. T. P. Lipscomb
- Primary users: Indian Navy: Christian & Missionary Alliance; Royal Dutch Shell; Yugoslav Air Force
- Number built: 25

History
- Introduction date: 31 December 1950
- First flight: 22 January 1948

The Short SA.6 Sealand was a light commercial amphibious aircraft designed and produced by Short Brothers. It was sized to accommodate between five and seven passengers as well as to suit the general overseas market in territories with suitable water access and/or runways. It could take off from and land on rivers, lakes and sheltered bays or prepared runways, and could be flown by either a single pilot or a pilot and navigator.

On 22 January 1948, the maiden flight of the Sealand took place; the first examples entered service roughly two years later. A total of two production variants of the type were produced, the SA.6 Sealand I and the SB.7 Sealand III, an extended version with longer wings, a deeper rudder and a strengthened hull. The proposed SB.2 Sealand II was intended as the type's second prototype, but was never completed as such, instead becoming the first of the batch of 4 pre-production aircraft G-AKLM to G-AKLP. The Sealand was flown by both civilian and military operators, the Indian Navy being a particularly prominent operator of the type. Its operational service included regular flights within various areas of the world, including Borneo, East Bengal, Norway and Venezuela.

== Development ==
In the immediate aftermath of the Second World War, conventional wisdom amongst operators and aircraft manufacturers alike held that the flying boats still had a relevant role to play in multiple niches. Shorts was a particularly active participant in the field, producing the Short Sandringham, a de-militarised conversion of the wartime Short Sunderland maritime patrol aircraft, which was proving itself in various corners of the world, while also undertaking the development of the Short Solent, an improved derivative of the Sunderland for the civilian sector. One of the company's designers, C. T. P. Lipscomb, examined the prospects for building three sizes of flying boat; these concepts were referred to as SA.6 (small), SA.7 (medium) and SA.8 (large).

The compact SA.6 concept appeared to have considerable sales potential, being sized as to facilitate its use from inland lakes and other bodies of water. During July 1946, the company announced its intention to produce the SA.6, assigning it the name Sealand, as a five to seven passenger, commercial amphibious aircraft. Design work was divided between the company's Rochester and Belfast facilities, the former worked on the hull and tail unit while the latter designed the wing and engine configuration. The design drew greatly upon the larger Solent, but also incorporated the latest advances in structural design, including the use of draw-sunk stiffeners for the ribs and bulkheads. The wing of the Sealand was given a higher aspect ratio than the Solent to improve its rate of climb and efficiency in cruise flight.

On 19 January 1948, the prototype Sealand was launched; it performed its maiden flight three days later from the waters of Belfast Lough, piloted by Shorts' Chief test pilot, Harold Piper. Having been flown from the water, as it lacked its undercarriage and several other pieces of equipment, the prototype was quickly furnished with remaining elements and flown to Sydenham Airport to commence land-based testing. One early modification was the lowering of its engines, which was changed to reduce the unduly high interference drag induced by their original position. Despite intentions to construct a second prototype powered by an alternative engine, the Alvis Leonides radial engine, as difficulties procuring the de Havilland Gipsy Queen 70–3 engines had been anticipated, no Sealands were built with the Alvis powerplant. Quantity production of the type was sanctioned by the Ministry of Civil Aviation in mid-1949.

== Design ==
The Short SA.6 Sealand was a high wing cantilever monoplane amphibious aircraft. It shared its basic configuration with the larger Short Solent flying boat, being roughly half its size and featuring some structural advances. The Sealand featured all-metal construction, possessing both a flying boat hull and under-wing floats for buoyancy. It was also provisioned with a standard tail-wheel undercarriage; the two main wheels retracted into recesses in the hull below the wings, while the tail wheel retracted behind the hull's planing bottom. The retraction mechanism was powered by a 450lb/sq pneumatic system; the aircraft was not fitted with a hydraulic system.

The passenger cabin, which was sized to accommodate up to seven passengers, was divided into two (connected via a gangway) by the box frames formed by the recesses for the retractable undercarriage. This cabin was lined by six particularly large windows; a single entrance door was on the port side of the fuselage, along with an extension door for freight loading or air ambulance missions. Hinged drop panels beneath the sliding windows and an external step eased the typically complex mooring process. The cockpit of the Sealand was designed to be suited for operation by a solo pilot, as well as by one accompanied by a navigator.

The Sealand was powered by a pair of de Havilland Gipsy Queen 70–3 inverted inline air cooled piston engines, each capable of generating up to 340 hp (250 kW). These engines were intentionally mounted as high as possible on the wing so that sufficient clearance from spray would be provided, although this was reduced somewhat during trials to reduce drag. To ease water handling, reversible-pitch propellers were installed, which could be used to reduce the landing distance required; this arrangement was effective enough that a water rudder was deemed to be unnecessary.

== Operational history ==
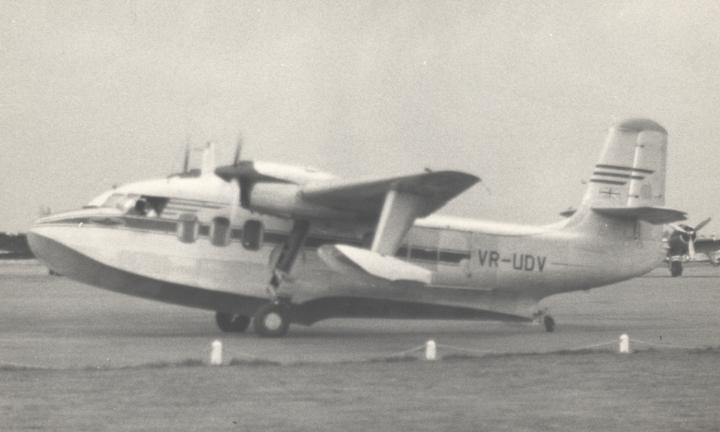
Short SA.6 Sealand VR-UDV of Shell Oil at Blackbushe in September 1954

Four pre-production aircraft were produced, the first of which was retained by Shorts for demonstration purposes (eventually crashing in fog while on a sales tour of Norway, killing both the pilot and the sales representative). The other three pre-production Sealands were eventually sold to overseas operators in Norway and Borneo. Early on in the type's career, it was determined that, while well suited for operating from sheltered waters and possessing largely favourable seaworthiness, landing upon the open sea was challenging for Sealand pilots, leading to some modifications being made to improve its performance.

As early as 1949, Shorts commenced vigorous sales efforts surrounding the Sealand; according to aviation author C. H. Barnes, demonstrations of the aircraft typically made good impressions on prospective customers. A further batch of ten Sealands were built and sold to a variety of small operators, including one (G-AKLW, later SU-AHY) equipped as an "air yacht" with luxurious fittings for a private client in Egypt and given the name Nadia. An early sale of a Sealand to an American customer garnered the distinction of being the first post-war sale of an aircraft to the American market.

During 1952, the Indian Navy ordered a batch of ten Sealands, which were built to an enhanced specification. The aircraft featured dual controls, increased fuel capacity and uprated engines. All ten aircraft were delivered between January and November 1953. The final Sealand in service with the Indian Navy was withdrawn twelve years later; one aircraft was preserved and placed on display at the Indian Naval Aviation Museum.

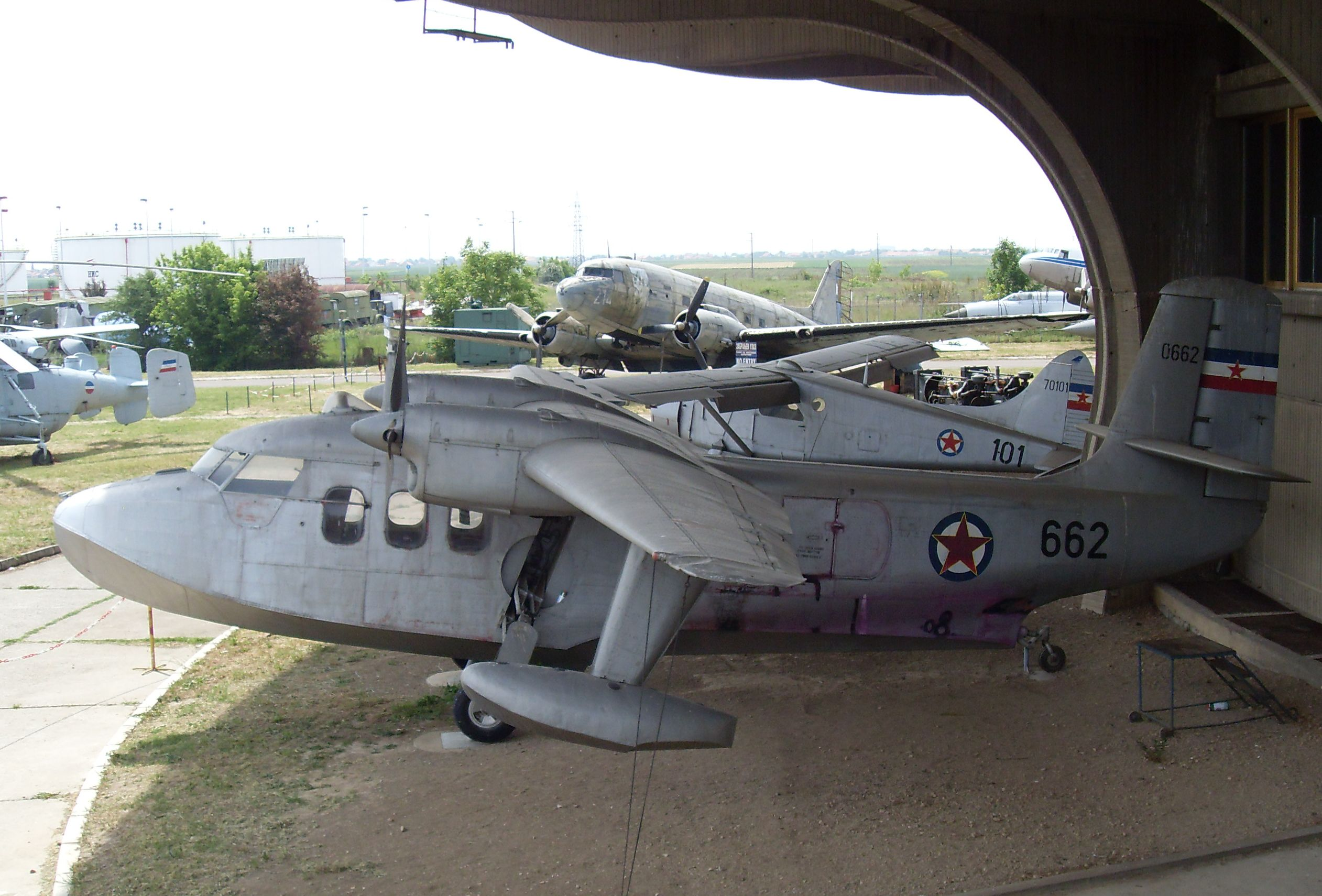
Short SA6 Sealand in the Air Museum in Belgrade (2009)

A second Sealand exists at the Air Museum in Belgrade, which is claimed to have been registered originally as G-AKLF. This registration was not assigned to a Sealand; this aircraft is also said to have borne the local registration YU-CFK, which indicates that it was the aircraft with the Shorts manufacturing number SH.1567, i.e. G-AKLS. A third, G-AKLW (originally bought by the wealthy Egyptian client mentioned above) was being rebuilt in 2008 at the Ulster Folk and Transport Museum at Cultra, Holywood, Northern Ireland. Shorts retained the first prototype (G-AIVX) for company use, often using it without the wing-floats and struts to increase payload. Seeing several years of use, it was ultimately scrapped after its Certificate of Airworthiness expired in April 1955.

== Variants ==
SA.6 Sealand
Prototype powered by two De Havilland Gipsy Queen 70-2 engines, one built
SA.6 Sealand I
Production variant with two De Havilland Gipsy Queen 70-3 engines, 14 built.
SB.2 Sealand II
Proposed variant with Alvis Leonides engines, not built
SB.7 Sealand III
Variant for operation in Norway with eight passengers and the landing gear removed, two conversions.
SA.6 Sealand
Variant for India with De Havilland Gipsy Queen 70– 4 engines, dual-controls and extra fuel tanks for six hours endurance, ten built.

== Operators ==
=== Civilian operators ===
Norway

- Vestlandske Luftfartsselskap (VLS) – two aircraft modified as Srs 1M seaplanes with landing gear removed.

Pakistan

- East Bengal Transport Commission

Sweden

- Aero Nord Sweden

United Kingdom

- Shell Oil
- Short Brothers

United States

- Christian & Missionary Alliance

Yugoslavia

- JAT

=== Military operators ===
India

- Indian Navy – ten Series 1L aircraft with Gipsy Queen 70-4 engines and dual controls, all delivered in 1953.

Saudi Arabia

- Royal Saudi Air Force – one aircraft donated to the RSAF for search and rescue duties.

Yugoslavia

- Yugoslav Air Force – two Series 1F aircraft transferred from JAT.

== Specifications (Sealand I) ==
Data from Shorts Aircraft since 1900, British Civil Aircraft 1919–1972

General characteristics

- Crew: 1 or 2
- Capacity: 5–7 passengers
- Length: 42 ft 2 in (12.85 m)
- Wingspan: 59 ft 0 in (17.98 m)
- Height: 15 ft 0 in (4.57 m)
- Wing area: 353 sq ft (32.8 m^{2})
- Empty weight: 7,007 lb (3,178 kg)
- Gross weight: 9,100 lb (4,128 kg)
- Powerplant: 2 × de Havilland Gipsy Queen 70-3 inverted inline air cooled piston, 340 hp (250 kW) each

Performance

- Maximum speed: 187 mph (301 km/h, 162 kn)
- Cruise speed: 175 mph (282 km/h, 152 kn)
- Range: 660 mi (1,060 km, 570 nmi)
- Endurance: 3.5 hr
- Service ceiling: 20,600 ft (6,300 m)
- Rate of climb: 880 ft/min (4.5 m/s)

== See also ==
Aircraft of comparable role, configuration, and era

- Piaggio P.136

Related lists

- List of flying boats and floatplanes
