= Bergen Airport, Flesland =

International airport serving Bergen, Norway

Bergen Airport Bergen lufthamn

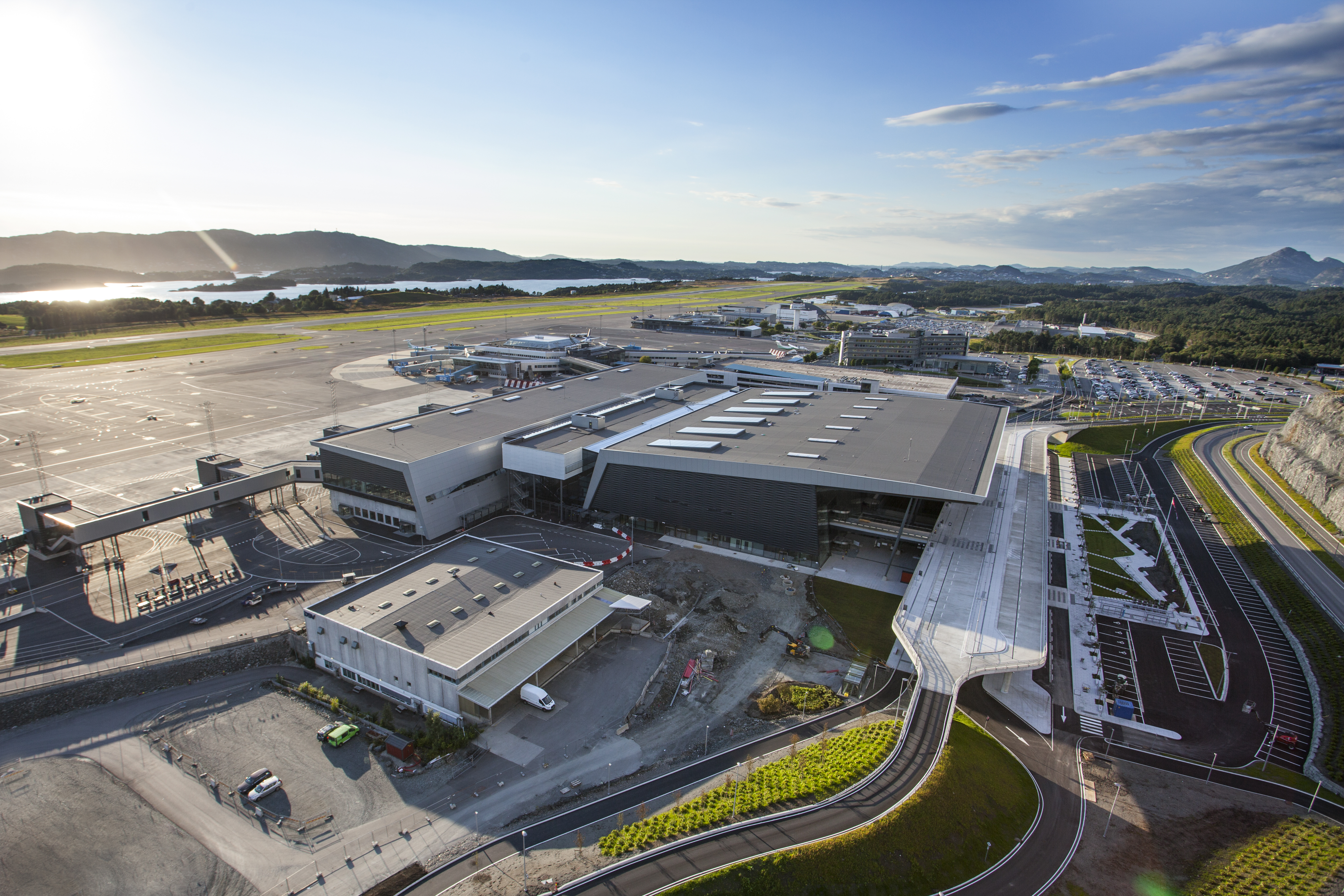
- IATA: BGO; ICAO: ENBR

Summary
- Airport type: Public
- Owner: Avinor
- Serves: Bergen, Norway
- Location: Flesland, Bergen, Vestland
- Focus city for: Bergen Air Transport; Bristow Norway; CHC Helikopter Service; Scandinavian Airlines
- Operating base for: Widerøe
- Elevation AMSL: 50.6 m (166 ft)
- Coordinates: 60°17′37″N 005°13′05″E
- Website: Official website

Map
- Location within Norway Location within Vestland

Runways
Direction	Length		Surface
Direction	m	ft	Surface
17/35	2,990	9,810	Asphalt/concrete

Statistics (2021)
- Passengers: 3,273,709
- Domestic: 1,893,728
- International: 432,436
- Heliport: 192,876

Bergen Airport (Nynorsk: Bergen lufthamn; IATA: BGO, ICAO: ENBR), alternatively Bergen Flesland Airport or simply Flesland Airport, is an international airport located at Flesland in the city and municipality of Bergen, Vestland, Norway. Opened in 1955, it is the second-busiest airport in Norway, with 6,306,623 passengers in 2018. Flesland is operated by the state-owned Avinor. Until 1999, Flesland Air Station of the Norwegian Air Force was co-located at the airport.

Scandinavian Airlines (SAS), Norwegian Air Shuttle and Widerøe are the largest airlines operating at the airport. The route to Oslo Airport, Gardermoen, is among the busiest in Europe. Substantial traffic is generated by CHC Helikopter Service and Bristow Norway to offshore oil platforms in the North Sea.

Originally, Bergen was served by water aerodromes at Flatøy, Sandviken, and Herdla. Financing of Flesland was largely secured through NATO funds, and the airport opened on 2 October 1955. Until the 1980s, Bergen was the Norwegian airport used for intercontinental flights by SAS to New York. New terminals were opened in 1988 and in August 2017. The Bergen Light Rail was extended to the airport in April 2017.

== History ==
=== Construction ===
The first aircraft to operate in Bergen was a demonstration flight by Carl Gustav Cederström on 25 September 1911. The first airport in the Bergen area was Flatøy Air Station, built by the Royal Norwegian Navy Air Service on the island of Flatøy. The water aerodrome was established in 1919; it remained in use until 1940. Norway's first scheduled airline service was started by Det Norske Luftfartsrederi between Bergen, Haugesund and Stavanger in 1920, and operated out of Bergen Airport, Sandviken, a water aerodrome just north of the city center. The aerodrome became the Bergen base for both Norwegian Air Lines and Vestlandske Luftfartsselskap.

Planning of an airport with an airstrip took place during the 1930s. A series of public institutions made various reports between 1931 and 1938, which largely recommended Flesland as a location, which was at the time located in the then independent Fana Municipality. The main alternative was Herdla, an island northernmost in Askøy Municipality, which was first recommended in 1933. The main disadvantage with Flesland was the topography and that it would not be possible to build longer runways than 800 and 850 meters (2,620 and 2,790 ft), respectively. A municipal committee recommended therefore in 1938 that Herdla be chosen, to be jointly financed by the state and the municipality

After the German occupation of Norway, the Wehrmacht started looking for a location for an airstrip. They were partially in need for a counteraction against British raids and in part in need to protect German ship traffic. Four locations were considered: Nesttun, Haukåsmyrene in Åsane, Flesland and Herdla. The choice of Herdla was taken after a German bomber emergency landed in a field and was later able to take off from there. Herdla received two runways, the longest 1,000 meters (3,300 ft) long.

The Civil Aviation Administration (CAA) started working on plans for an airport for Bergen in 1947. Herdla was by them seen as the prime candidate, again based on the poor topography around Bergen. The CAA recommended that Herdla be chosen and that the two runways be expanded. However, its director, Einar Bøe, was skeptical to the Herdla plans, citing the lack of possibilities to extend the runway past the initially proposed 1,500 meters (4,900 ft) and the long travel distance from Herdla to the city. At the time there was no bridge either from Herdla to Askøy nor from Askøy to the mainland, nor was there a road across the island. Transport would therefore have to be carried out from Bergen using a ferry. The Minister of Transport and Communications Nils Langhelle from Bergen supported Bøe's concerns and recommended that Parliament place construction of an airport serving Bergen on hold.

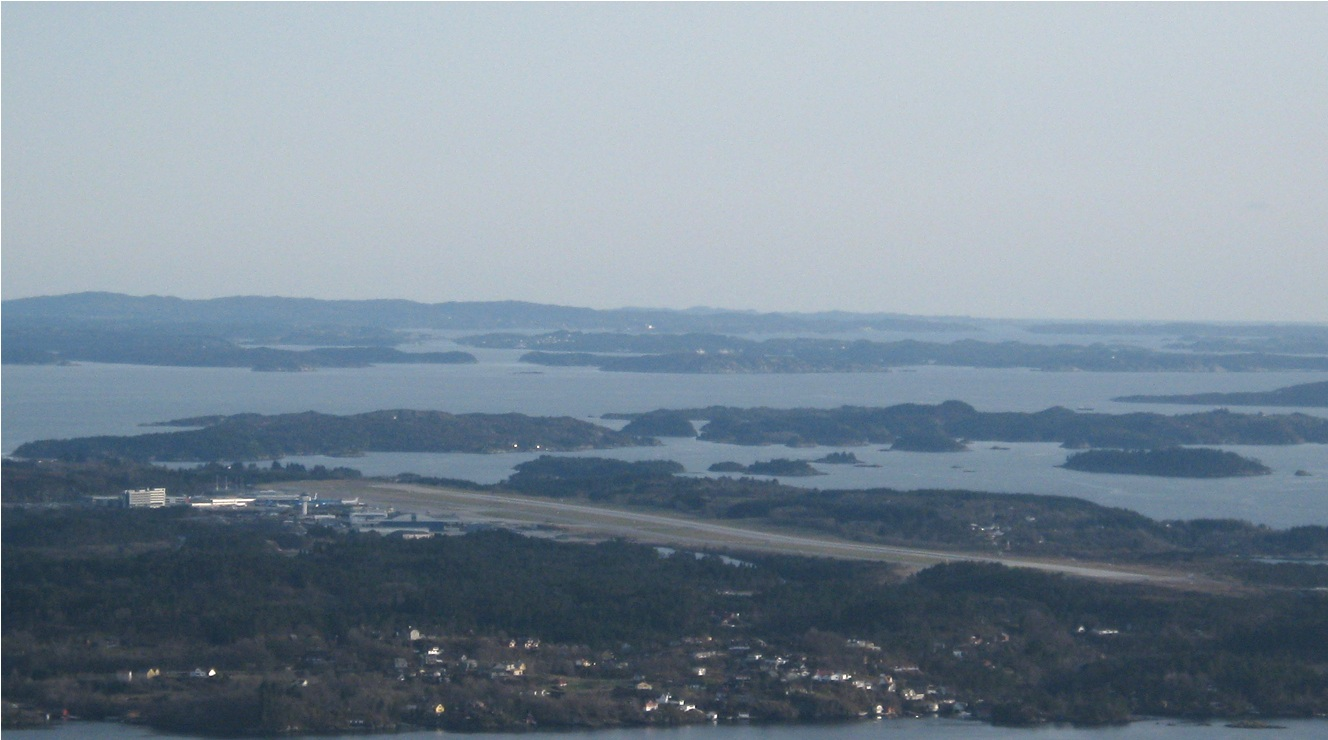
Aerial view of Flesland in 2010

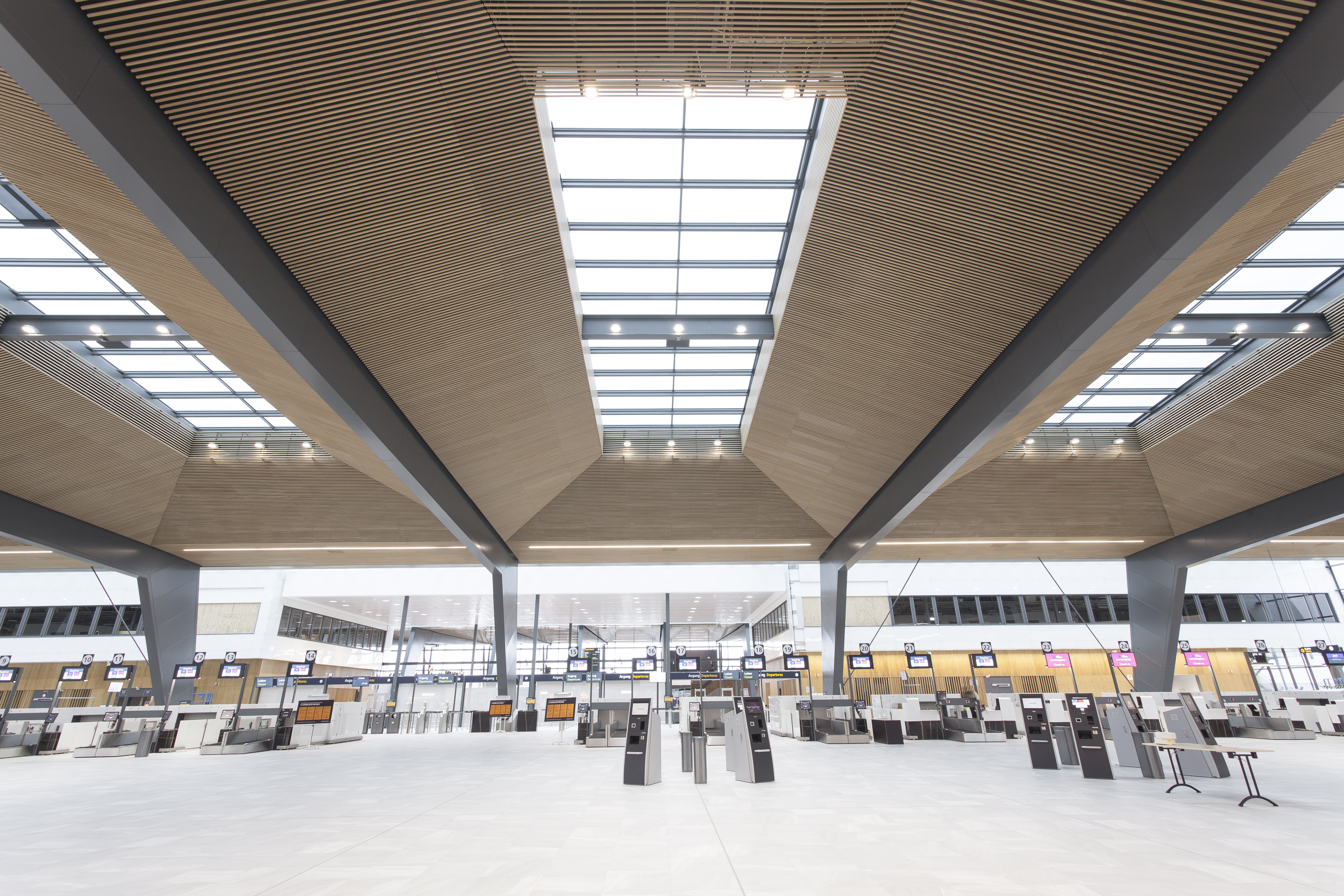
Check in area in the new terminal opened in 2017

Engineering reports were made of both Herdla and Flesland in 1950 and 1951. Previous investigations of Flesland had concluded that the length of the runway was limited to a small valley which is located at about the middle of the current runway. The new report proposed connecting the proposed area to a larger area to the south of the valley, which was at the right elevation. This would allow for a 3,000-meter (9,800 ft) long runway. A political concern was the high cost of constructing a new airport. By 1950, land airports had been built for Oslo Airport, Fornebu, Stavanger, Trondheim and Kristiansand. This was supplemented with SAS deciding to terminate the services to Oslo and instead provide a feeder service to Stavanger.

Alternatives were launched by two competing airlines: Braathens SAFE proposed a minor upgrade to Herdla which would allow them to operate with their de Havilland Heron aircraft. Widerøe on their side proposed using their Consolidated PBY Catalina flying boats, but these proved to expensive. At the same time the Royal Norwegian Air Force stated looking at Flesland as a suitable air station. Military engineers surveyed the area and concluded that it was well-suited for military purposes. The North Atlantic Treaty Organization (NATO) granted funding for seven air stations in Norway in 1952, but these did not include Flesland.

Financing was instead secured through a national military communications project, of which 16 million Norwegian krone (NOK) was set aside over a period of three years, which would secure construction of a 1,460-meter (4,790 ft) runway. A further NOK 4 million was presumed financed by the municipalities of Bergen and Fana to build a terminal, eminent domain and a road. The plans were passed by Parliament on 25 April 1952. The military funding was arranged by Langhelle, who by then had been appointed Minister of Defence. Flesland received additional NATO grants in 1953, which would finance NOK 50 million and the Ministry of Defence NOK 5 million. The increased funding allowed the runway to be extended to 2,440 meters (8,010 ft).

Construction started on 14 August 1952 with construction of a road from Blomsterdalen. Construction on the airport itself started in early 1953. Between 200 and 300 people worked on the construction, some of whom lived in sheds at Nordheim. Work was carried out in two shifts. Thirty farms were partially expropriated. Half a million cubic meters (18 million cu ft) of rock were blasted and a similar amount of earthwork moved in the construction process. The work consisted of a 2,440-by-45-meter (8,005 by 148 ft) runway and an equivalently long taxiway, although it was only half the width. The terminal building cost NOK 200,000 and was located next to a parking lot with space for 70 cars. A 12 kilometers (7.5 mi) long barbed wire fence circumferenced the airport. The airport had an instrument landing system from the start. Two people were killed in the construction, which had a total cost of NOK 70 million.

=== Early operational history ===
The first aircraft to land at the airport was a de Havilland Canada DHC-3 Otter of the Air Force on 18 June 1954. At the time, 800 meters (2,600 ft) of the runway was completed. The paved section was extended to 1,500 meters (4,900 ft) and several Douglas DC-3 aircraft landed. The first revenue flight was a charter carried out by Braathens SAFE for SK Brann, who flew to Oslo to play a football match. The military officially took the airport into use on 14 September 1954. The official civilian opening took place on 2 October 1955. By then, the airport had a temporary terminal and control tower, the airport road was not paved, aviation fuel tanks were not installed and there was no snow-removal equipment.

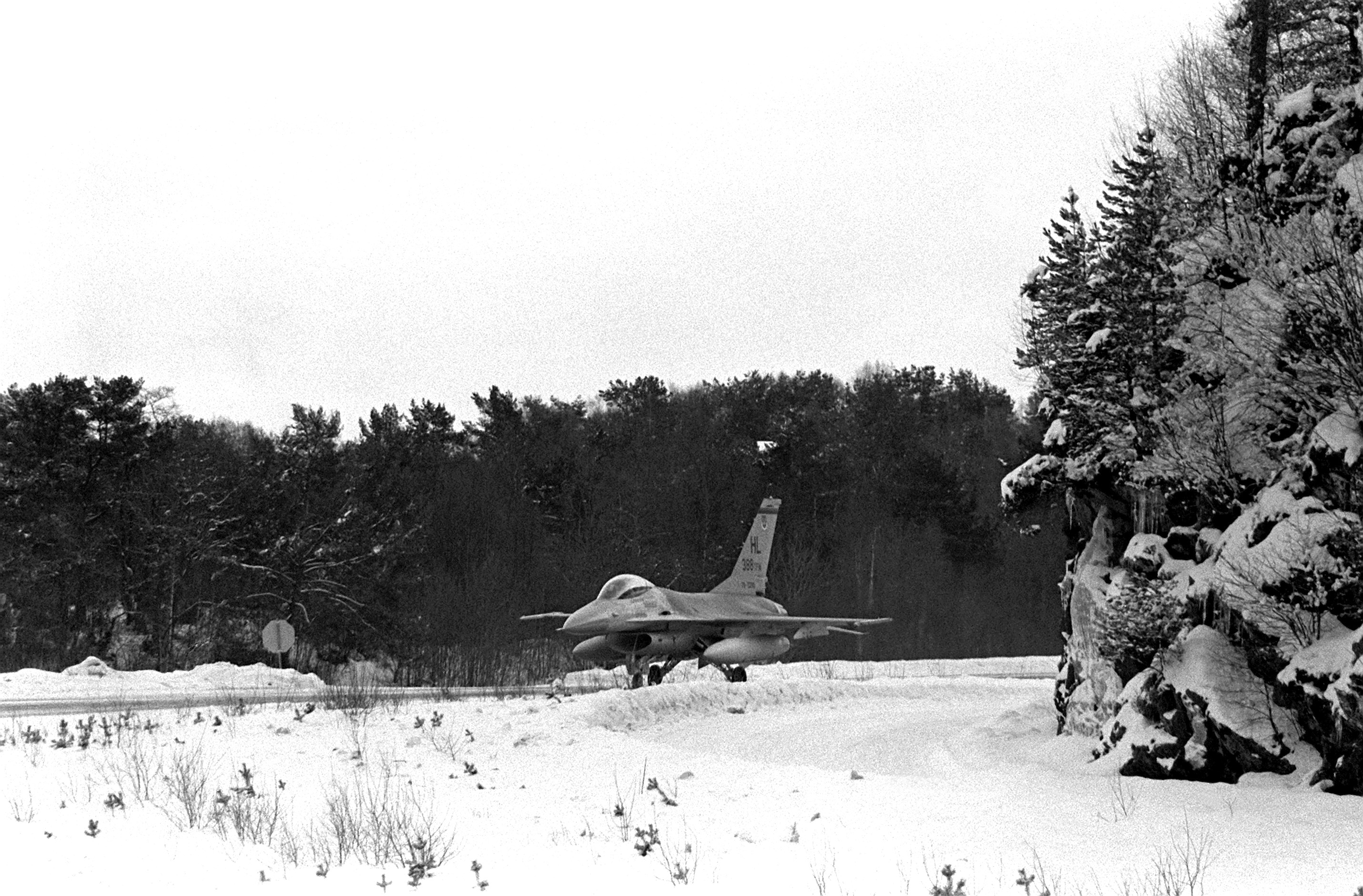
US Air Force General Dynamics F-16 Fighting Falcon visiting Flesland Air Station in 1981

From the opening, Flesland was served by three airlines. SAS flew three round trips to Oslo and once per day to Stavanger, Kristiansand and onwards to Aalborg in Denmark, with correspondence onwards to Copenhagen. Twice per week, the Stavanger flight corresponded with services to London and Amsterdam. Vestlandske Luftfartsselskap flew services northwards along the coast to towns in Møre og Romsdal and to Trondheim. Iceland-based Loftleiðir received permission to operate a flight from Flesland via Reykjavík to New York twice per week.

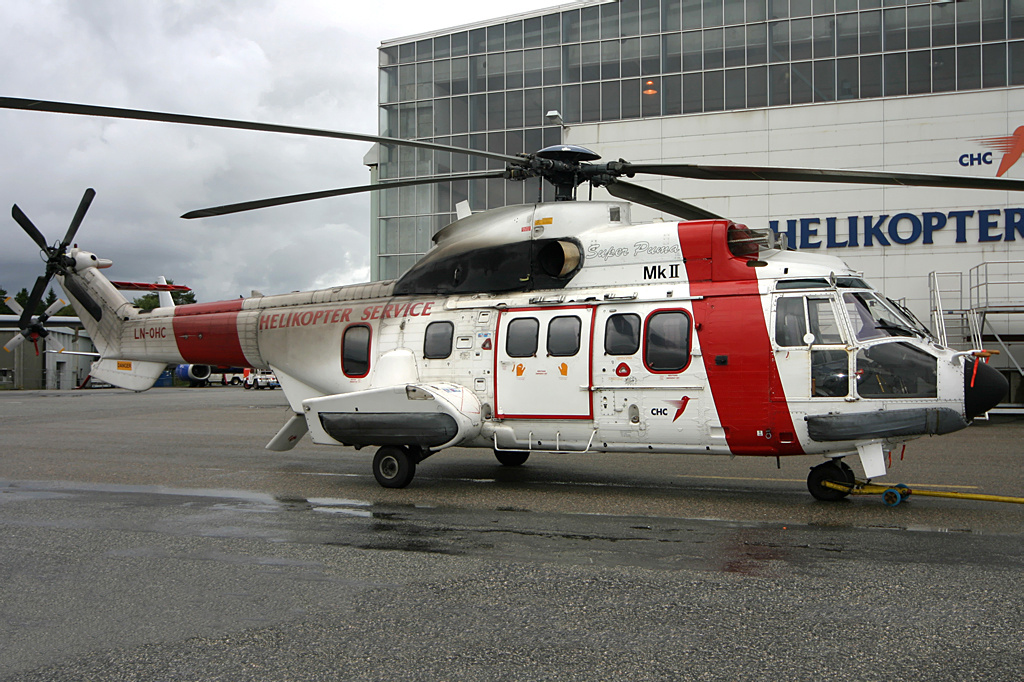
Eurocopter Super Puma operated by Helikopter Service

The airport had 70,000 passengers during its first twelve months of operations and exceeded 100,000 the following year. The temporary terminal was too small for this traffic and already during construction there was designed a larger terminal by Halfdan Grieg. By 1956, it was determined that the new terminal building would be too small. Also, an expansion of the runway was discussed that year. SAS announced that they would take delivery of the intercontinental jetliner Douglas DC-8, which would require a longer runway than was available at both Flesland and Fornebu. The cost of extending the runway to 3,000 meters (9,800 ft) would cost NOK 3.5 million in Bergen and NOK 30 million in Oslo.

Helikopter Service established itself at Flesland in 1958, two years after the Stavanger-based company was established. The same year, Vestlandske Luftfartsselskap filed for bankruptcy and Ålesund Airport, Vigra, opened. Thus Braathens SAFE was awarded the concession for the route Stavanger–Bergen–Ålesund–Trondheim. Both SAS and Braathens were granted concession to operate the route from Kristiansand via Stavanger to Bergen. The same year, a new terminal building opened.

During a short period in 1959, there was a squadron stationed at Flesland. From 1962, there were regular detachments within NATO that were earmarked for Flesland. Every other year, there were larger exercises with about a dozen aircraft and lasting for several weeks. Smaller training sessions were held every six weeks. The air station was upgraded in 1962 and consisted of a series of mountain halls, which could house more than twenty-five fighter aircraft. These also included barracks and commando facilities. Flesland was designated as a deployment site for nuclear warheads by NATO, which had prior to 1962 been designated to Sola Air Station. Components for nuclear bombs were most probably stored at Flesland, although the warheads themselves were probably not stored there.

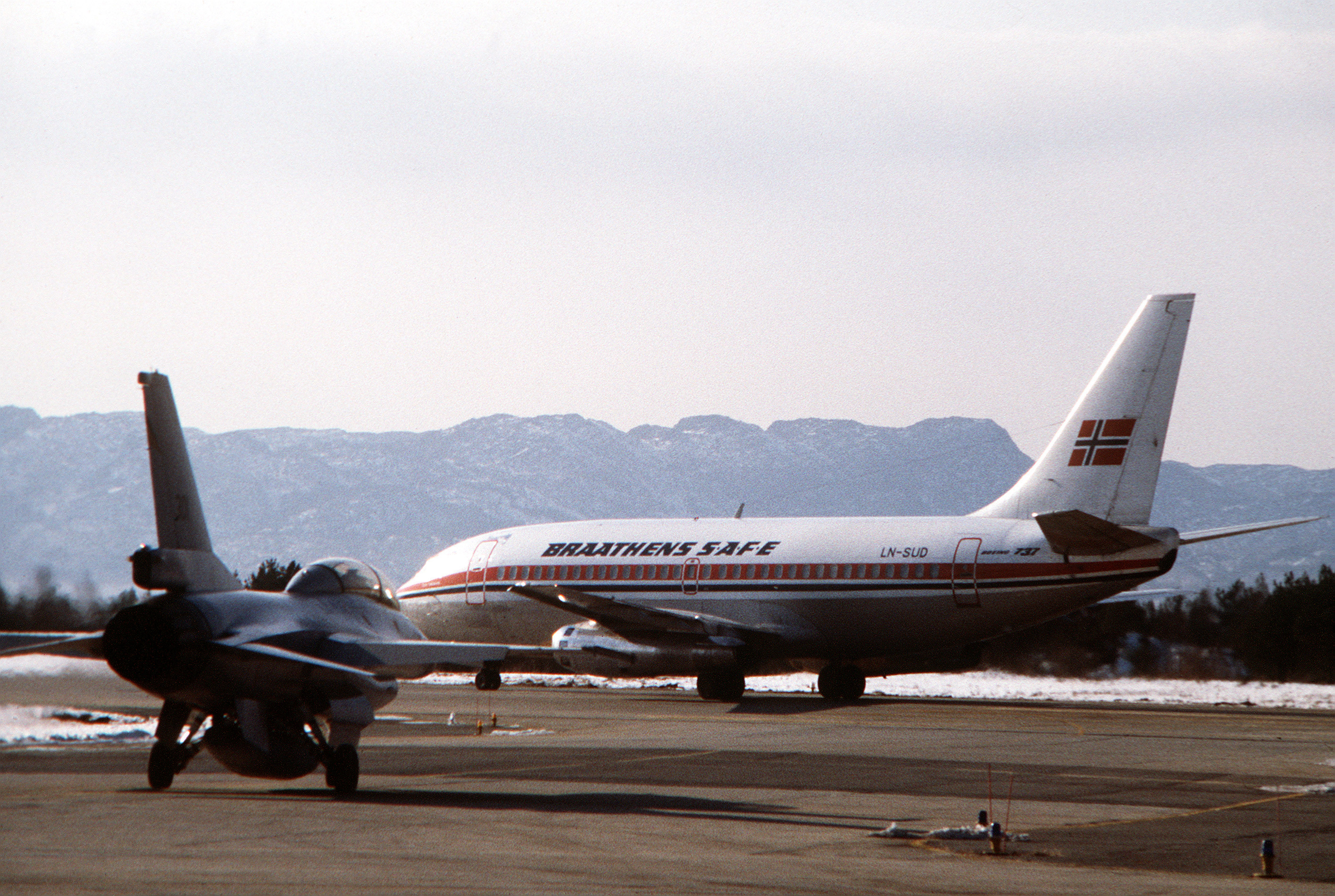
US Air Force General Dynamics F-16 Fighting Falcon and Braathens Boeing 737-200 at Flesland in 1981

With the delivery of DC-8-aircraft, SAS started a direct service to New York. The runway at Fornebu was too short to handle the DC-8, so Flesland became the main intercontinental hub in Norway. Another important factor during the 1960s was the low range of the aircraft—thus Bergen was a stop-over for aircraft from Stockholm and Copenhagen. Later, the route was taken over using the Boeing 747. SAS started a direct service from Bergen to Tromsø in 1965. Kristiansund Airport, Kvernberget, opened in 1970, with Braathens SAFE receiving the route concession from Bergen. Two years later, in a national realignment of concessions, SAS lost their right to fly to Tromsø. Instead Braathens SAFE was granted the right to fly from Bergen via Ålesund, Kristiansund, and the newly opened Molde Airport, Årø, to Bodø and Tromsø.

The first four regional airports in Sogn og Fjordane and Møre og Romsdal were opened in 1971, and Widerøe started flights to Florø, Førde, Sogndal and Ørsta–Volda. They were operated with de Havilland Canada DHC-6 Twin Otter aircraft, and passengers had to transfer at Flesland to reach Oslo. A SAS service to New York from Oslo Airport, Gardermoen, was introduced in 1974, and gradually the service was reduced, in part because of the increased range of newer aircraft. Haugesund Airport, Karmøy, opened in 1975, and SAS opened a service between the two cities.

Because of the increase of traffic was making the terminal building more cramped, a new administration building opened in the early 1970s, with a fire station in the ground floor. At the peak in 1976 and 1977, the air station had 60 employees and 15 conscripts. Helikopter Service started services to offshore oil platforms in May 1976; the first services were to Statfjord and were flown using Sikorsky S-61 helicopters. Busy Bee started a competing service from Bergen via Haugesund to Stavanger in 1982. Two years, late Norsk Air started a service from Sandefjord. Braathens SAFE was allowed to operate the Oslo to Bergen route from 1987. Automatic check-in machines were introduced the following year.

=== Demilitarization and deregulation ===
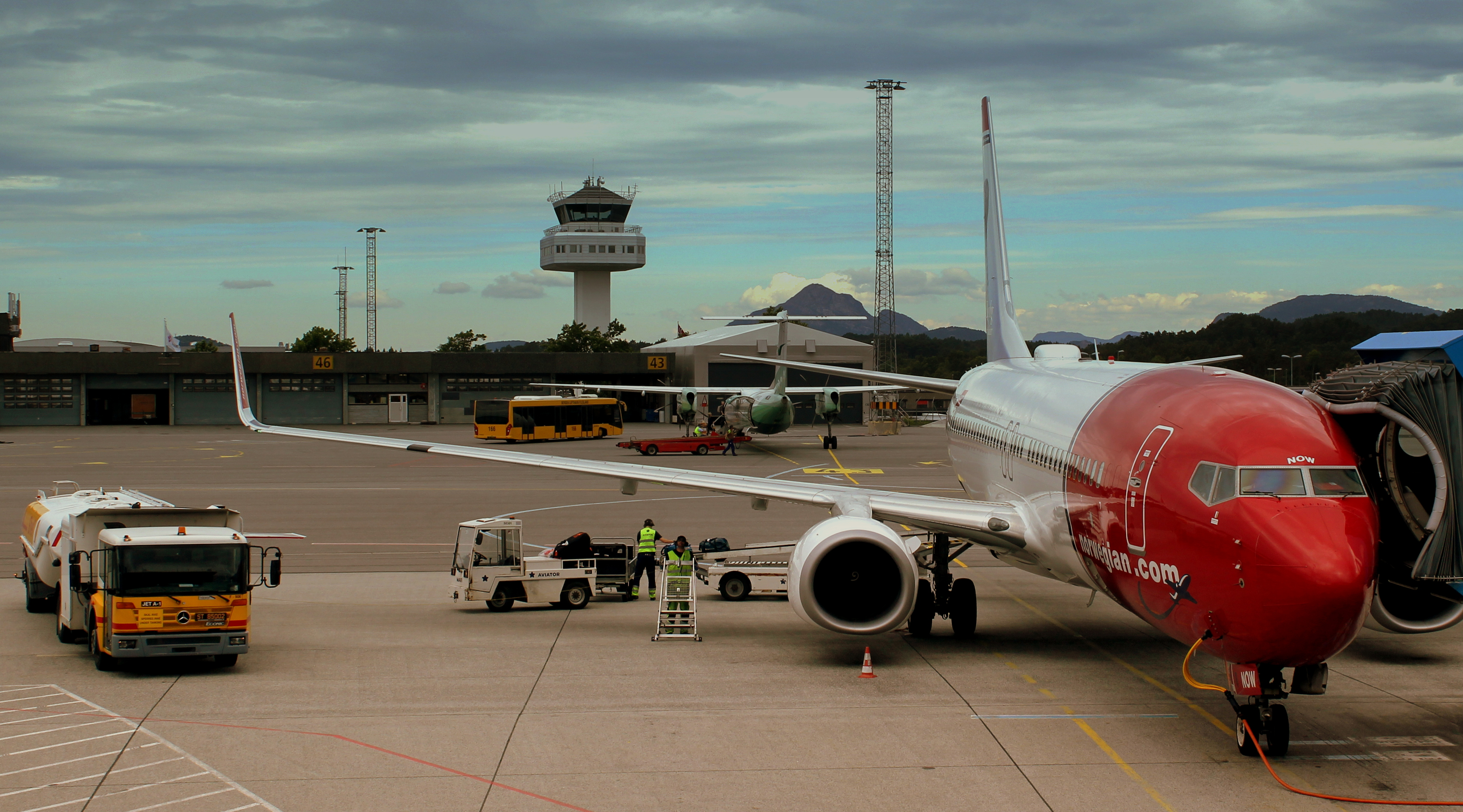
A Boeing 737-800 of Norwegian Air Shuttle at a domestic gate; the control tower in the background

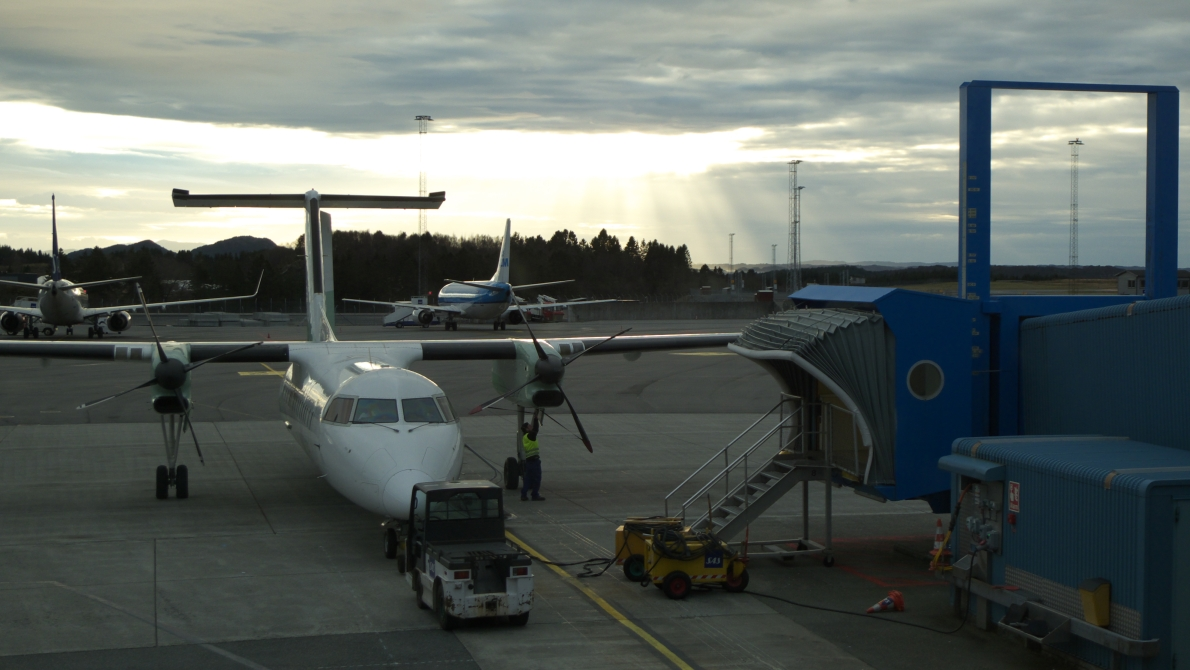
Widerøe Dash 8 with Scandinavian Airlines and KLM Boeing 737 in the background

The current terminal opened in 1988, was also designed by Halfdan Grieg and cost NOK 250 million. This was followed up with a new control tower which opened in 1991. It had a limited height because of restrictions caused by the military designation of the main parallel taxiway as an emergency runway. By the mid-1980s there were 35 to 40 daily offshore helicopter flights out of Flesland each day. This was causing a press on the runway's capacity as the helicopters had to cross the runway to reach the North Sea. As estimates showed up to 60 flights per day, the airport started working on plans for a separate helicopter terminal, which would have been located southwest of the old main terminal and would have its own helicopter runway. Instead the traffic flatted out and the old main terminal was converted to a helicopter terminal. Braathens Helikopter established a base with two helicopters at Flesland in 1990. Within two years it had secured a thirty-percent market share of the offshore traffic. However, the airline was taken over by Helikopter Service in 1993.

With the ending of the Cold War following the dissolution of the Soviet Union in 1991, the military activity at Flesland diminished. Planning of the downgrading of the air station had started in 1988, and from 1995 only personnel necessary for maintaining infrastructure was left, reducing the crew to 33. Braathens SAFE introduced its first international Bergen service in 1991, to Newcastle. Norwegian Air Shuttle, originally a regional airline, took over Braathens' and Busy Bee's regional services from Bergen following the latter's bankruptcy in 1992. Norwegian originally flew to Kristiansand, Haugesund, Molde and Kristiansund. The domestic airline market was deregulated on 1 April 1994, so airlines no longer needed a concession to operate domestic routes. The immediate consequence was an increase of the number of flights by Braathens SAFE to Oslo.

Oslo Airport, Gardermoen opened on 8 October 1998, replacing the congested Fornebu. For the first time, an airline could receive sufficient landing slots to challenge SAS and Braathens on domestic routes. The low-cost carrier Color Air was established, and started flights from Oslo to Bergen using Boeing 737-300 aircraft. The following price war on the route saw lower ticket prices and increased capacity. Color Air filed for bankruptcy on 27 September 1999, ending a price war which had cost the airlines NOK 3 billion. The final demise of the air station came in 1999, when all stationary assets were sold, including 30 vehicles. The daily operation of the air station was transferred to the Royal Norwegian Navy, who have six employees at the base. Flesland Air Station has since only held mobilization status and will only be used by the air force in case of war and larger emergencies. Bergen Air Transport started flights to Notodden Airport in 1999. A new secondary surveillance radar was built between 1999 and 2001 at Sotra. The domestic terminal was expanded with 500 square meters (5,400 sq ft) and a new baggage sorting area with 800 square meters (8,600 sq ft) in 2001.

SAS bought Braathens in 2001, and from the following year, only SAS flew the Oslo route. Within months, Norwegian started a low-cost route to Gardermoen. SAS Commuter took over Norwegian's regional routes in 2003. The Norwegian Meteorological Institute closed its office at the airport in 2003 and all meteorological observations have since been carried out by Avinor. In 2004, SAS and Braathens merged to form SAS Braathens. The airline changed its name back to Scandinavian Airlines in 2007. The international arrival section was expanded with 450 square meters (4,800 sq ft) in 2005, followed by an extra story over part of the terminal, used as offices and allowed a doubling of the size of the duty-free.

Wanderlust announced Flesland as Europe's best and the world's sixth-best international airport in 2009. The helicopter terminal was renovated in 2009. An airport surveillance radar was installed in 2010 and a new backup radar was installed in 2011. An additional 350 square meters (3,800 sq ft) of office space was added in 2010. Widerøe took over SAS' regional routes to Bergen in 2010. From May to September 2022, United Airlines offered service to Newark.

== Facilities ==
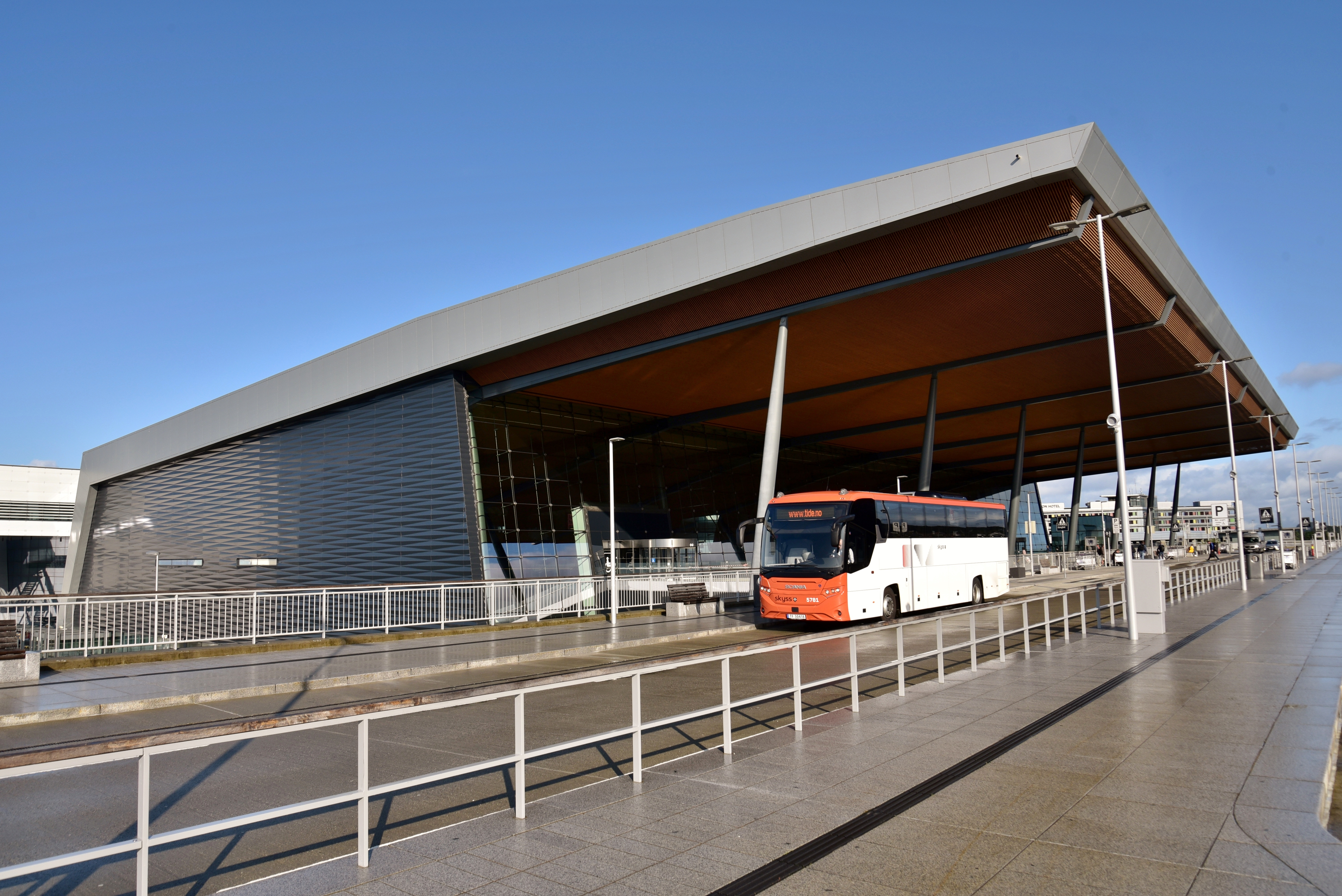
Exterior view of the main terminal

The main terminal covers an area of 21,000 square meters (230,000 sq ft), of which 14,200 square meters (153,000 sq ft) is used for passenger areas. The terminal has reached its capacity for simultaneous passengers, and especially security, check-in, arrival hall and baggage handling have limited space.

All passengers traveling on international flight must pass through the duty-free shop in order to get to their flight. There is a possibility for some passengers (for example, those allergic to perfume) to ask security to use a narrow corridor which bypasses the shop. Nonetheless, the layout has been criticized by teetotalist organizations. The airport's response is that the layout was needed due to the terminal's small size. The shop has also been criticized for informing passengers who purchase less than their permitted tax-free quota of alcohol that they are allowed to purchase more. The Norwegian Directorate for Health and Social Affairs indicated that this may violate the ban on alcohol advertising.

The gates at the new terminal are numbered B15 to B20. They are served by domestic flights. International flights depart from the older 1988 terminal which has 9 jet bridges, numbered 23 through 29, 31 and 32. Gate 30, next to gate 29, is used for apron buses. Gate 24 has the largest parking space and can take category E aircraft (such as the Airbus A340 and Boeing 747), the rest are category C (such as Boeing 737 and Airbus A320). Gates 28 to 32 can be configured to serve domestic flights as well as international flights.

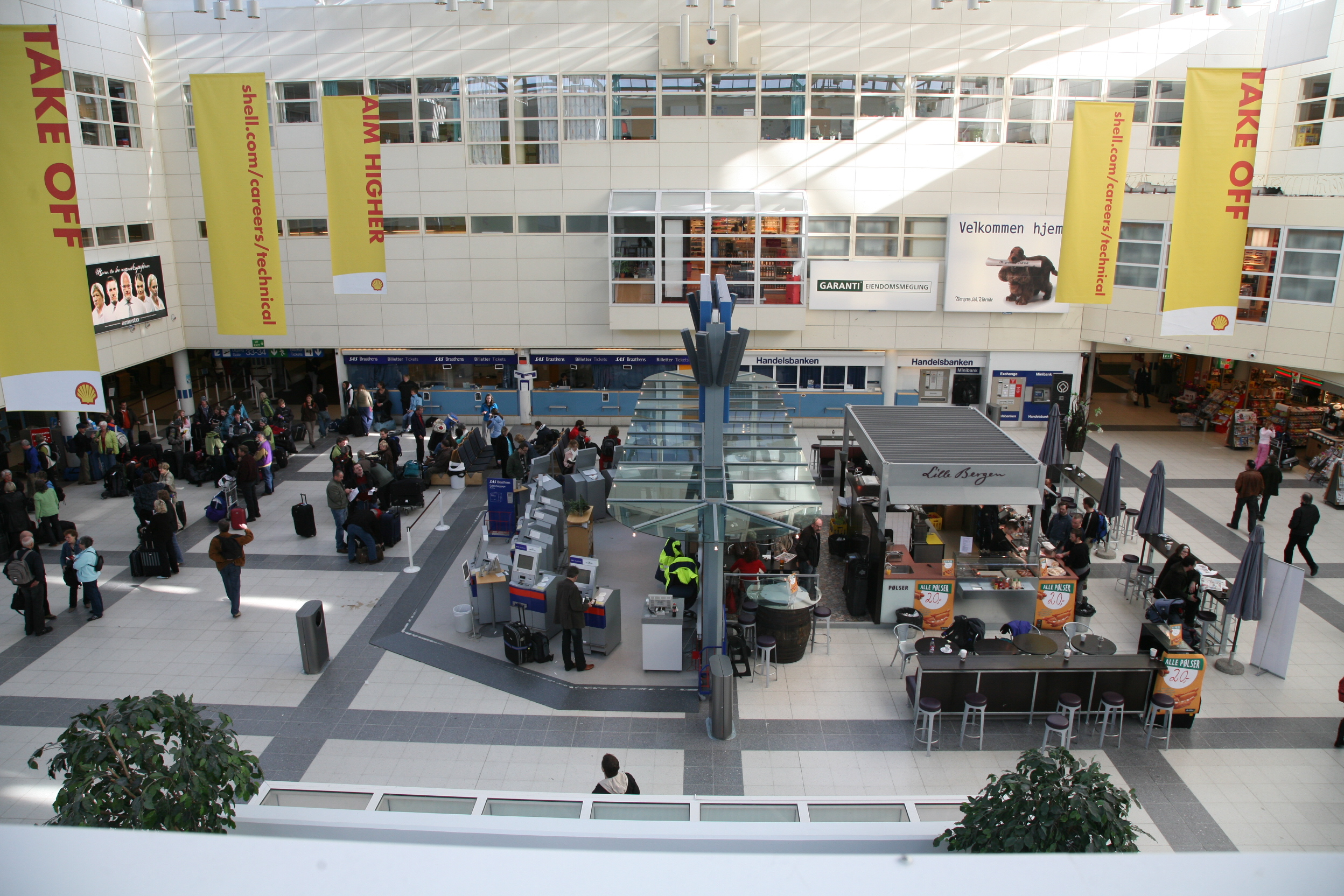
The old landside hall. It has since been replaced by the new terminal.

The helicopter terminal is located in the old terminal from the airport's opening and covers an area of 8,030 square meters (86,400 sq ft). There are nine helicopter stands, of which six are outside the terminal building. The control tower is next to the helicopter terminal and has an area of 160 square meters (1,700 sq ft). It lacks visual sight lines to stands south of the terminal, the de-icing and parts of the taxiway. Nearby is the fire station; the 2,850 square meters (30,700 sq ft) building is also used for offices. There are a series of other hangars and buildings at the airport, owned by various airlines, ground handling companies, aviation clubs and general aviation companies.

The airport has a single 2,990 by 45 meters (9,810 by 148 ft) runway numbered 17–35 (roughly north–south). The runway has 7.5-meter (25 ft) shoulders on each side and has 2,450 meters (8,040 ft) between the touchdown points. The runway has a parallel taxiway (Y), with nine intersections. There is also a taxiway further in along between the terminal and technical area (W). There are six intersections between W and Y, one of which leads to the military area. There is instrument landing system (ILS) category I on both directions. The airport has an airport surveillance radar; there are both a surveillance radar and a backup radar located on Sotra. The runway has a capacity of maximum twenty landings and twenty departures per hour.

The runway, main taxiway and all areas to the north of the civil aviation area are owned by the military. Flesland Air Station no longer has stationed aircraft, but there is activity in several of the military installations. Flesland is occasionally used during exercises. The military has indicated that it may choose to sell its estate at the airport in the future. Avinor and the military have initiated a process that may result in the runway and taxiway being transferred to Avinor ownership.

== Airlines and destinations ==
As of June 2023, Bergen Airport serves 63 destinations in regular services and 28 seasonal or charter destinations primarily during the summer. In addition, offshore oil platforms are served from the helicopter terminal. Twenty-three airlines operate regular flights out of Flesland. They are served by two ground handling agents, SAS Ground Services and Norport Handling.

The largest airlines at Flesland are Scandinavian Airlines, Norwegian Air Shuttle and Widerøe. SAS and Norwegian exclusively operate jetliners on main-haul international and domestic routes. Widerøe operates the routes to Florø, Sogndal and Ørsta–Volda on public service obligation contract with the Ministry of Transport and Communications. The airline's remaining routes are commercial. The airline uses various sizes of the Bombardier Dash 8. Bergen Air Transport is based at Flesland, and offers general aviation and executive jet operations. Bristow Norway and CHC Helikopter Service operate to offshore oil platforms from the helicopter terminal. Lufttransport transport maritime pilots to ships on behalf of the Norwegian Coastal Administration.

Airlines	Destinations
Air France	Paris–Charles de Gaulle
airBaltic	Seasonal: Riga
Austrian Airlines	Seasonal: Vienna
Edelweiss Air	Seasonal: Zürich
Eurowings	Seasonal: Düsseldorf
Finnair	Stockholm–Arlanda; Seasonal: Helsinki
Icelandair	Reykjavik–Keflavik
Jet2.com	Seasonal: Edinburgh, Manchester
KLM	Amsterdam
Loganair	Seasonal: Inverness, (Note: Inverness service is a continuation of the Sumburgh service as the same flight number) Kirkwall, (Note: Kirkwall service is a continuation of the Sumburgh service as the same flight number) Sumburgh
LOT Polish Airlines	Gdańsk
Lufthansa	Frankfurt; Seasonal: Munich
Norwegian Air Shuttle	Alicante, Berlin, Copenhagen, Gran Canaria, Kraków, London–Gatwick, Málaga, Manchester, Oslo, Palanga, Riga, Stavanger, Trondheim; Seasonal: Antalya, Barcelona, Bergamo, Chania, Dubrovnik, Edinburgh, Gdańsk, Harstad/Narvik, Nice, Palma de Mallorca, Paris–Charles de Gaulle, Rome–Fiumicino, Split, Stockholm–Arlanda, Tenerife–South
Scandinavian Airlines	Copenhagen, Oslo, Stavanger, Stockholm–Arlanda, Trondheim; Seasonal: Alicante, Málaga, Milan–Malpensa
Smartwings	Prague (begins 26 October 2026)
Sunclass Airlines	Seasonal charter: Sal, Varna
Widerøe	Aberdeen, Ålesund, Alicante, Bodø, Brussels, Dublin, Florø, Gothenburg, Hamburg, Haugesund, Kristiansand, Kristiansund, Molde, Munich, Sandefjord, Sogndal, Stavanger, Tromsø, Trondheim, Ørsta–Volda; Seasonal: Billund, Florence, Oslo, Vagar,
Wizz Air	Budapest, Gdańsk, Kraków, Szczecin, Vilnius, Warsaw–Modlin

== Traffic ==
In 2024, Bergen Airport handled about 6,538,000 passengers, the highest number in its history and almost three percent more than in 2023, surpassing the 6,436,000 passengers of 2019. International traffic grew by ten percent, mainly through foreign visitors, while domestic traffic fell by one percent; the number of commercial flight movements declined by four percent as the average cabin factor rose from 69 to 72 percent.

In 2014, Bergen Airport had 6,078,589 passengers, 106,225 aircraft movements and 5,199 tonnes of cargo, making it the country's second-busiest airport. The passenger numbers consisted of 3,669,600 domestic scheduled, 2,162,781 international scheduled, 138,252 transit passengers, and 246,208 helicopter passengers. Bergen has ten percent of Norway's international traffic.

Sixty-four percent of the airport's domestic traffic was business, compared to thirty-five percent for international flights. Seventy-one percent of the international traffic was generated by people living in Norway. For domestic flights, SAS has a market share of 46 percent, Norwegian 38 percent, Widerøe 15 percent and others 1 percent. For international flights, Norwegian has a market share of 36 percent, SAS 23 percent, KLM 18 percent, Lufthansa 9 percent and others 15 percent. In comparison, in 2003 SAS had a market share of 71 percent for international routes and 78 percent for domestic routes.

In 2011, the Oslo–Bergen route had 1,680,000 passengers, making it the second busiest route in Norway (after Oslo–Trondheim). It was in 2007 the seventh-busiest route in Europe. The routes from Bergen to Stavanger and Trondheim are the busiest routes in Norway which do not operate through Oslo. Norwegian and SAS nearly split the Oslo market evenly, although SAS has 54 percent of the business market and Norwegian 58 percent of the leisure market. Since 2003, the percentage of passengers traveling from Bergen who are dependent on transferring abroad before reaching their ultimate destination has fallen from about 60 percent to below 40 percent.

Annual passenger traffic
Year	Passengers	% Change
2025	6,704,306	▲2.2%
2024	6,560,457	▲2.4%
2023	6,405,239	▲6.8%
2022	5,995,234	▲83.1%
2021	3,273,709	▲20.7%
2020	2,711,276	▼ -58.3%
2019	6,505,827	▲3.2%
2018	6,306,623	▲3.2%
2017	6,113,452	▲2.8%
2016	5,949,060	▼ -1.2%
2015	6,021,020	

Busiest international routes from Flesland (2012)
Rank	City	Passengers	Airline
1	London-Gatwick and London-Heathrow, United Kingdom	604,211	Widerøe, Norwegian Air Shuttle, Scandinavian Airlines
2	Copenhagen, Denmark	328,579	Norwegian Air Shuttle, Scandinavian Airlines
3	Amsterdam, Netherlands	258,859	KLM
4	Frankfurt am Main, Germany	213,300	Cityjet, Lufthansa
5	Stockholm-Arlanda, Sweden	115,830	Norwegian Air Shuttle, Scandinavian Airlines
6	Paris-Orly, France	73,921	Norwegian Air Shuttle
7	Barcelona, Spain	69,534	Norwegian Air Shuttle, Scandinavian Airlines, Vueling
8	Berlin-Schönefeld and Berlin-Tegel, Germany	54,827	Air Berlin, Lufthansa, Norwegian Air Shuttle
9	Aberdeen, United Kingdom	51,484	Widerøe
10	Reykjavik-Keflavík, Iceland	40,721	Icelandair

Busiest domestic routes from Flesland (2012)
Rank	City	Passengers	Airline
1	Oslo-Gardermoen, Akershus	1,513,336	Norwegian Air Shuttle, Scandinavian Airlines
2	Stavanger-Sola, Rogaland	711,692	Norwegian Air Shuttle, Scandinavian Airlines, Widerøe
3	Trondheim-Værnes, Trøndelag	402,889	Norwegian Air Shuttle, Scandinavian Airlines
4	Ålesund-Vigra, Møre og Romsdal	140,127	Norwegian Air Shuttle, Scandinavian Airlines
5	Oslo-Torp, Vestfold	130,691	Norwegian Air Shuttle, Widerøe
6	Kristiansand-Kjevik, Agder	129,617	Norwegian Air Shuttle, Scandinavian Airlines, Widerøe
7	Oslo-Rygge, Østfold	94,417	Danish Air Transport
8	Kristiansund-Kvernberget, Møre og Romsdal	72,144	Widerøe
9	Florø, Vestland	60,427	Widerøe
10	Molde-Åro, Møre og Romsdal	55,584	Widerøe

== Ground transport ==
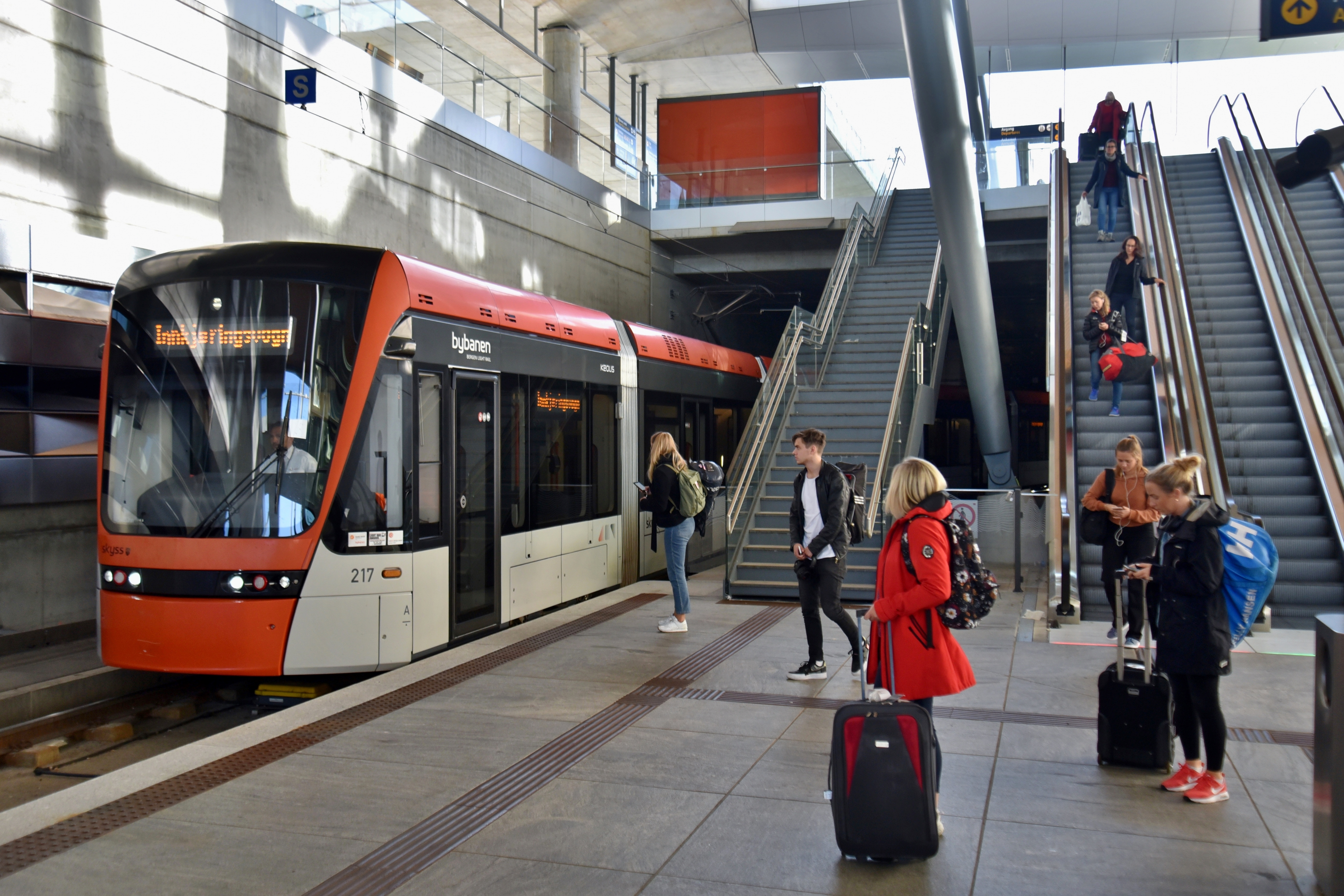
The underground light rail stop

Flesland is located along National Road 580, about 20 kilometers (12 mi) from the city center and about 30 minutes drive. Avinor has 3,500 parking spaces at the airport, of which 1,500 are in a parking garage. An additional 700 parking spaces are provided by the private Flesland Parkering; although located further away, it provides a shuttle bus service to the terminal. The airport has five car rental companies with a combined fleet of 100 vehicles.

The Bergen Light Rail has its final stop at the airport and opened in April 2017.

Tide's coaches have a travel time of about 20 minutes, and operate every 10 minutes. They alternate operating via Fjøsanger and Fyllingsdalen, At Flesland Quay, connected to the airport by shuttle bus, there are several fast ferry services to Austevoll, Sunnhordland, Haugesund and Stavanger. Four taxi companies operate at the airport. The modal distribution of ground transport is 21 percent use bus, 31 percent use taxis, 27 percent are driven by others and 20 percent use their own car. This is less than half the public transport share of Trondheim and almost a third of Gardermoen, but much higher than Stavanger.

== Accidents and incidents ==
A helicopter crashed on Turøy near Bergen on 29 April 2016, when flying from the Gullfaks B oil platform to the Bergen Airport. It was a Eurocopter EC225 Super Puma. All thirteen people on board (two crew, 11 passengers) were killed in the crash.

== Future ==
Avinor is currently in the final stages of building a new terminal building immediately southeast of the current terminal. Based on a design by Narud Stokke Wiig Arkitekter og Planleggere (now Nordic — Office of Architecture), it is scheduled for completion in 2016 and is estimated to have sufficient capacity until 2026. The new terminal will have an area of 78,000 square meters (840,000 sq ft) and have a capacity for 10 million annual passengers. In addition to larger terminal capacity, it will give the airport six new gates. The price is estimated at NOK 2 Billion and will also include an expansion of the Bergen Light Rail to the airport.

The runway is considered upgraded to ILS Cat II or III, which will allow for landing during less visibility. There are only a few minor investments needed for the upgrade. Avinor estimates that there will be a need for a second runway at about the mid-2030s. The runway can be located on the current military area and be entirely located north of the terminal area. This would allow a 2,260-meter (7,410 ft) runway, which would be sufficient for Boeing 737 and Airbus A320 aircraft. The master plan of 2011 includes plans for expanding the new terminal by placing gates on both sides of the pier and building a new pier to the north, by demolishing the current terminal. By Phase 3C, which is estimated to be carried out by 2060, the airport will have 32 gates and 14 additional apron stands. The last phases of the long-term plan involve demolishing the current terminal and the airport hotel. The Norwegian State Railways has looked at the possibility of building a mainland railway airport rail link from Bergen Station in the city center. The proposal was launched as a response to the idea that a new freight terminal be built at Flesland. If built, the line would run in a tunnel through Løvstakken and travel time would be twenty minutes.

== Gallery ==
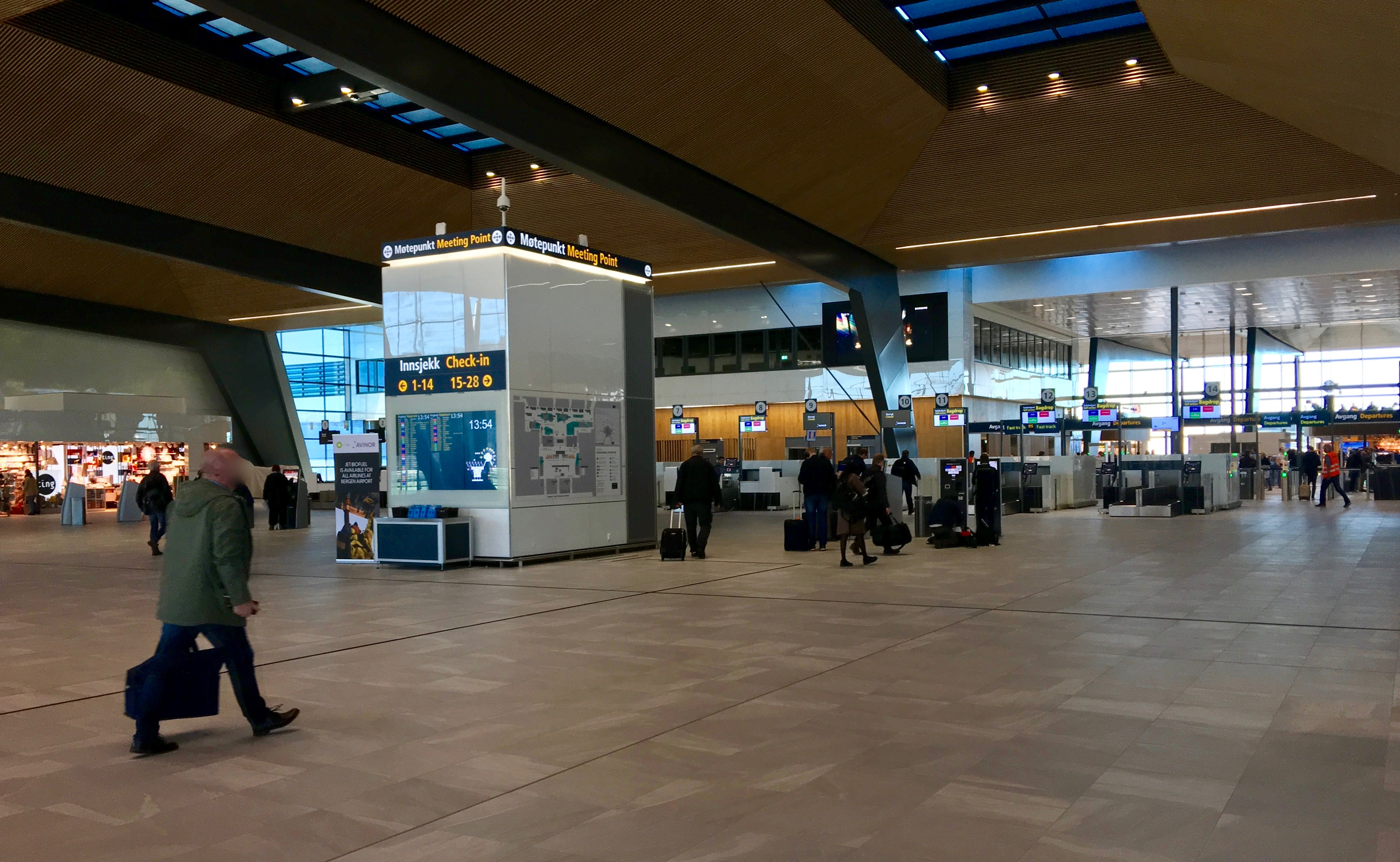
Departure area

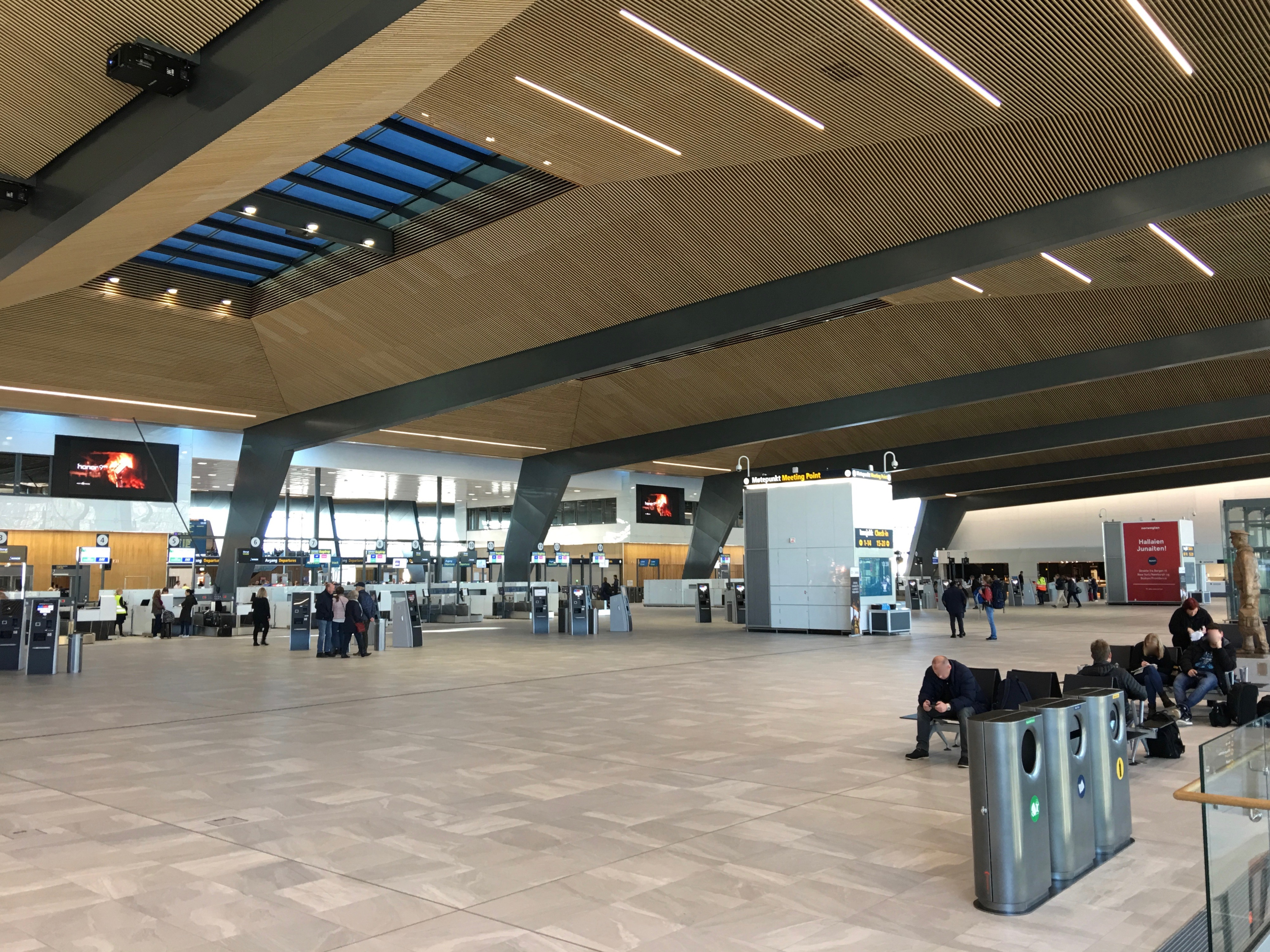
Departure area

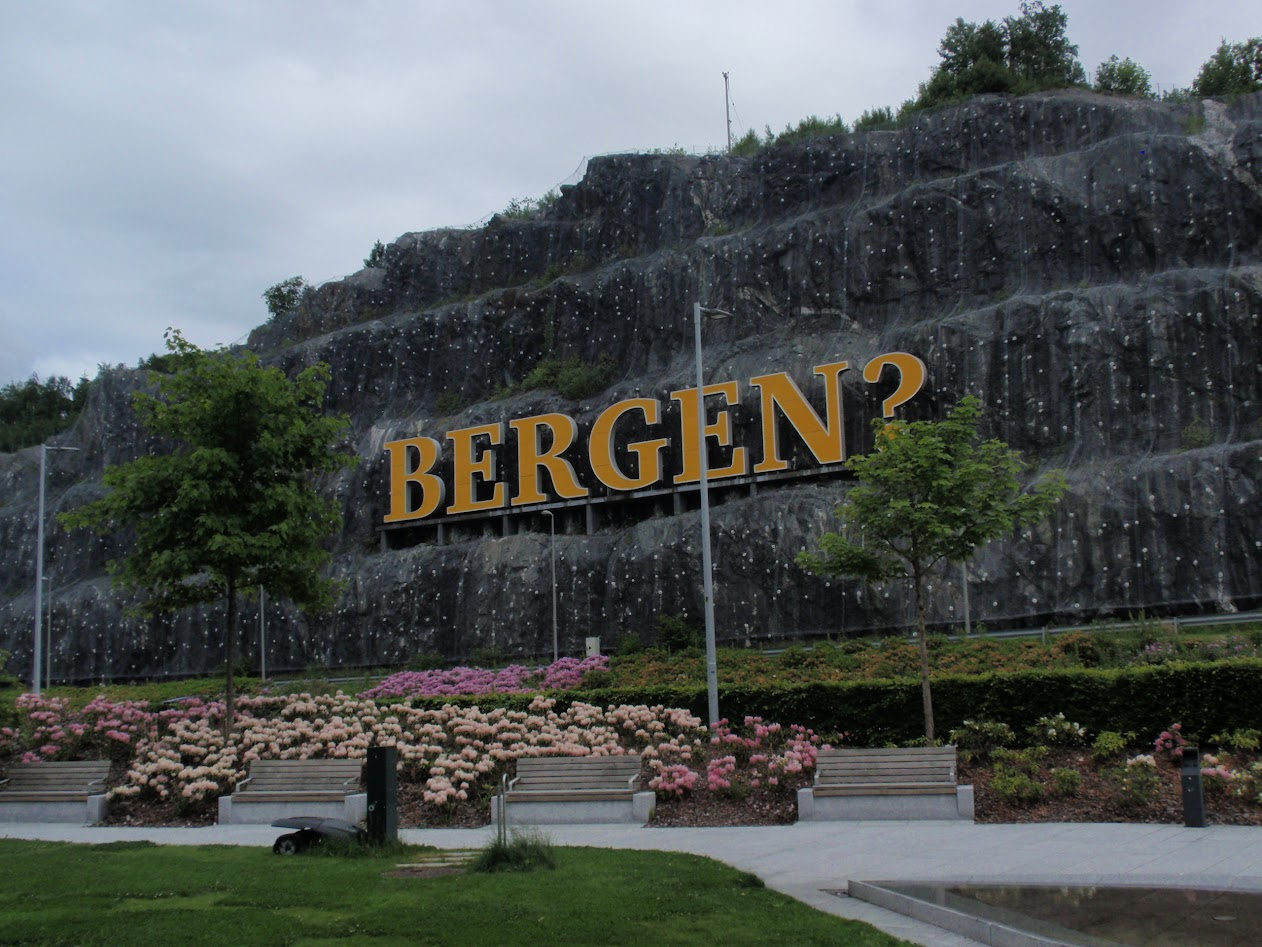
Big sign outside of the airport

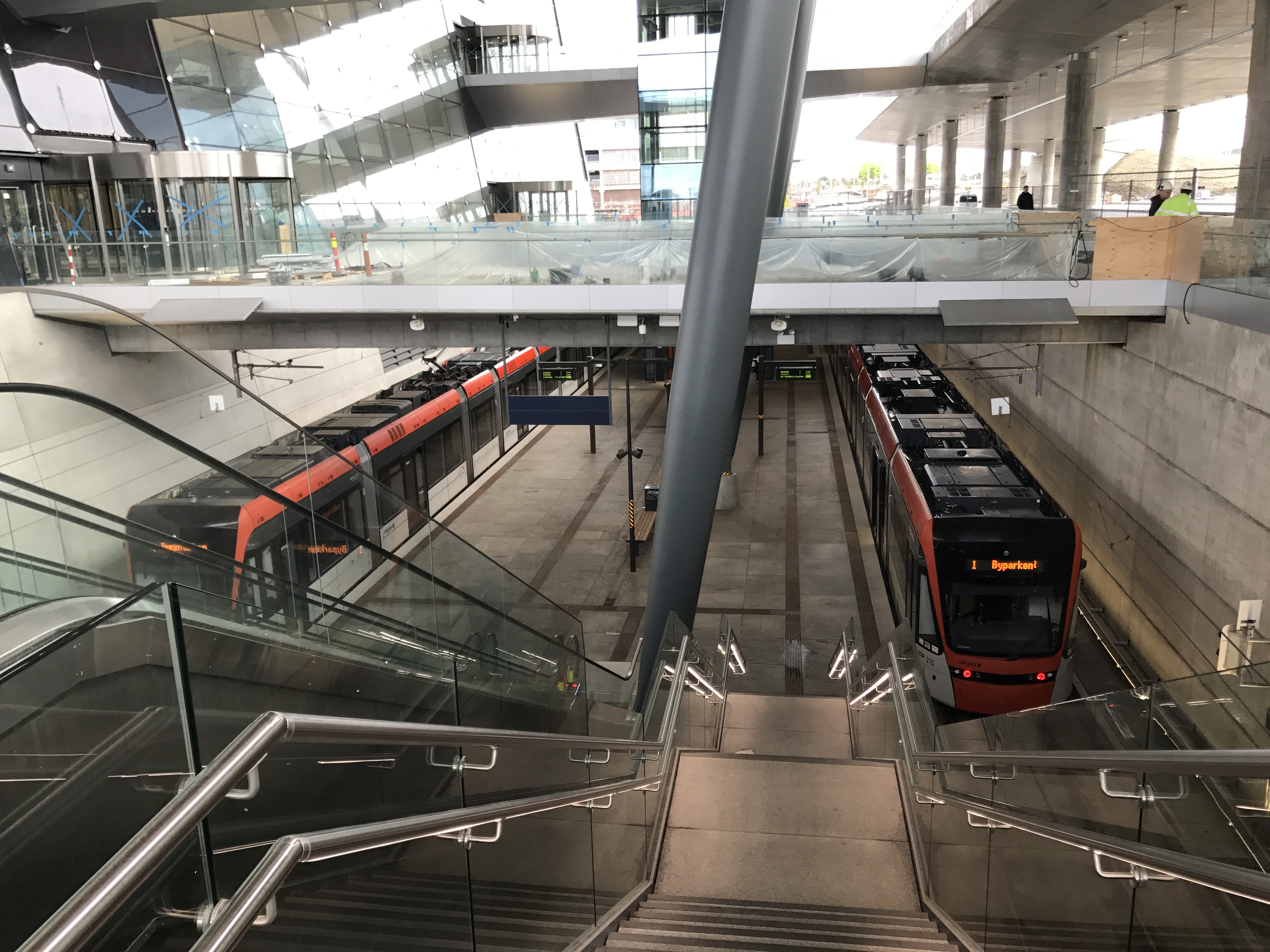
Light rail station underneath the airport terminal

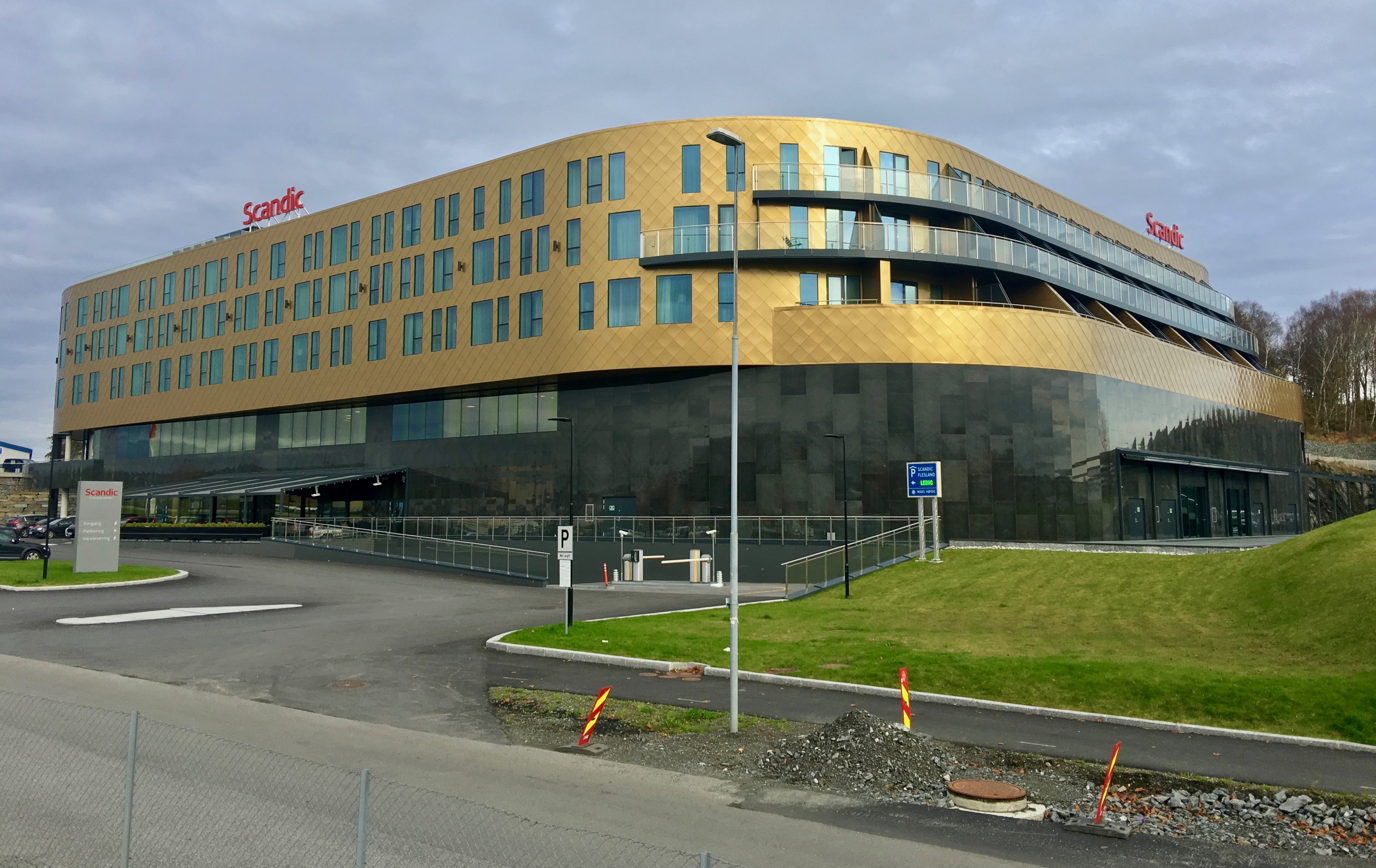
Scandic Hotel at Flesland
