= Flesland =

- Neighborhood in Bergen
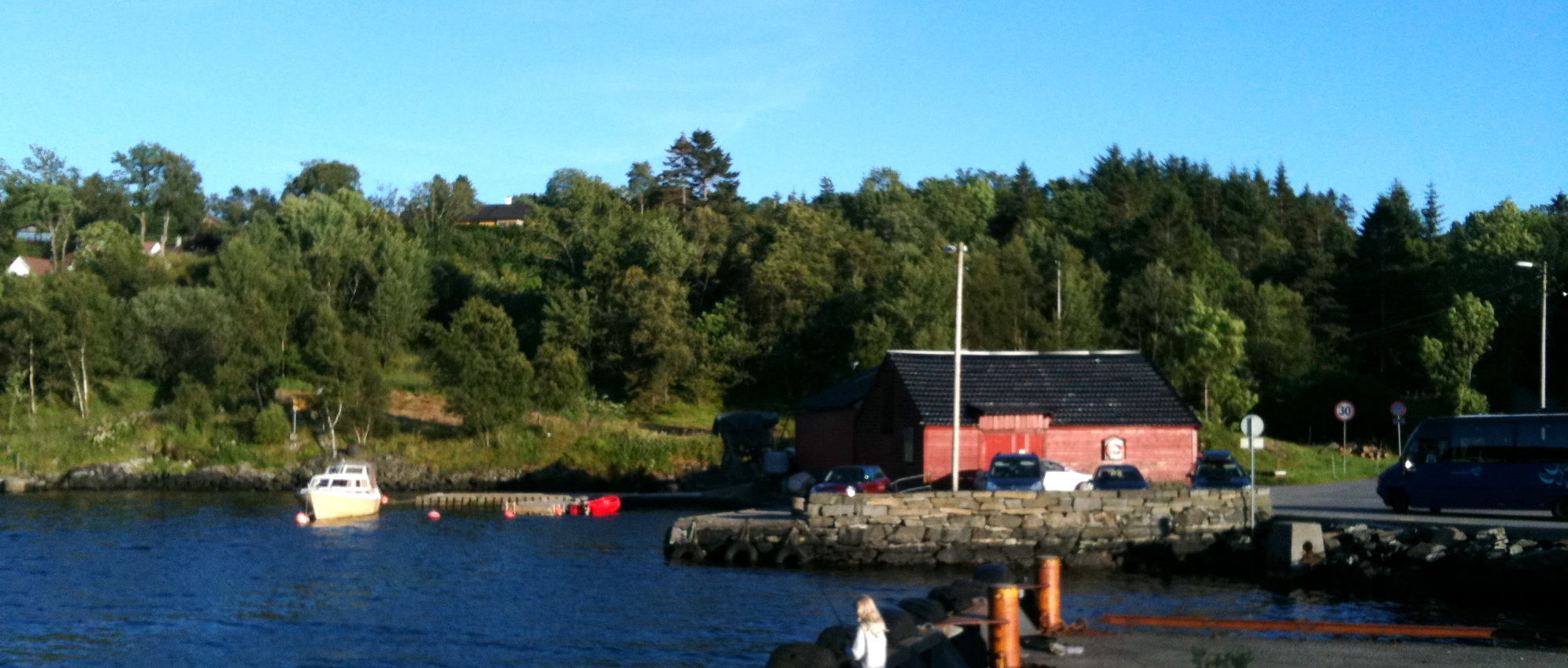
- View of the neighborhood
- Interactive map of Flesland
- Coordinates: 60.2958°N 5.2129°E
- Country: Norway
- Region: Western Norway
- County: Vestland
- Municipality: Bergen
- Borough: Ytrebygda

Area
  - Total: 0.44 km^{2} (0.17 sq mi)
- Elevation: 23 m (75 ft)

Population (2025)
  - Total: 344
  - Density: 782/km^{2} (2,030/sq mi)
- Time zone: UTC+01:00 (CET)
  - Summer (DST): UTC+02:00 (CEST)

Flesland is a village in the borough of Ytrebygda in Bergen Municipality in Vestland county, Norway. It sits on the western coast of the Bergen Peninsula along the Raunefjorden, about 13 kilometres (8.1 mi) southwest of the city centre of Bergen. It is the site of Bergen Airport, Flesland and Flesland Air Station.

The 0.44-square-kilometre (110-acre) village has a population (2025) of 344 and a population density of 782 inhabitants per square kilometre (2,030/sq mi).

== Name ==
The village is named after the old Flesland farm, and the Old Norse form of the name was probably Flesjaland. The first element is the genitive plural of fles which means "skerry" or "sunken rock" and the last element is land which means "land" or "farm".
