= Halfdan Grieg =

Norwegian ship-owner

Halfdan Grieg (17 December 1907 – 6 February 1971) was a Norwegian shipowner.

He was born in Bergen as a son of ship-owner Halfdan Grieg, Sr. (1864–1940) and Ragna, née Geelmuyden (1868–1947).

He finished his secondary education in 1926 and took mercantile education at Columbia University in 1926–27. After shipping experience in the United States, England and Germany he worked in the shipping firm Joachim Grieg & Co. from 1932 and became a partner in 1937. During the occupation of Norway by Nazi Germany he was imprisoned in Bergen in June–July 1942.

After the war he became involved in the fledgling commercial aviation industry in Norway, as chairman of the board of West Norway Airlines. He died in 1971.
